= Crates of Tralles =

Crates of Tralles (Greek: Κράτης) was an orator or rhetorician in the school of Isocrates.

David Ruhnken (1768) assigns to Crates of Trallus the logoi dēmēgorikoi which Apollodorus of Athens ascribes to the Academic philosopher Crates of Athens. Further, Ruhnken writes, Gilles Ménage was wrong in supposing that Crates was mentioned by Lucian: the person mentioned by Lucian is Critias, an Athenian sculptor.
