= Telecles =

Ancient Greek philosopher

Telecles (Ancient Greek: Τηλεκλῆς, romanized: Tēleklês), of Phocis or Phocaea, was the pupil and successor of Lacydes, and was joint leader (scholarch) of the Academy at Athens together with Evander.

In the final ten years of Lacydes' life (c. 215 – c. 205), Evander and Telecles had helped run the Academy due to Lacydes being seriously ill. They continued running the Academy after the death of Lacydes, without formally being elected scholarchs. On Telecles' death in 167/6 BC, Evander remained scholarch for a few more years. Evander himself was succeeded by his pupil Hegesinus. Concerning the opinions and writings of this philosopher nothing is known except that he was an Academic Skeptic.
