= Crantor =

3rd-century BC Greek Academic philosopher

Crantor of Soli
- Born: Mid 4th century BC; Soli
- Died: c. 276/5 BC; Athens

Philosophical work
- Era: Ancient philosophy
- Region: Ancient Greek philosophy
- School: Old Academy
- Institutions: Platonic Academy
- Notable students: Arcesilaus
- Main interests: Ethics
- Notable works: On Grief

Crantor of Soli (Greek: Κράντωρ, gen.: Κράντορος; died 276/5 BC) was an Ancient Greek philosopher and member of the Old Academy who was the first philosopher to write commentaries on the works of Plato.

== Life ==
Crantor was probably born around the middle of the 4th century BC, at Soli in Cilicia (modern-day Turkey). He moved from Cilicia to Athens in order to study philosophy, where he became a pupil of Xenocrates and a friend of Polemon, and one of the most distinguished supporters of the philosophy of the older Academy. As Xenocrates died 314/3 BC, Crantor must have come to Athens prior to that year, although the date of his birth is not known. He died before both Polemon and Crates, who succeeded Polemon as scholarch. Dropsy was the cause of his death. He left his fortune, which amounted to twelve talents, to Arcesilaus, who had been his pupil and who later succeeded Crates as scholarch of the Academy.

== Writings ==
His works were very numerous; but of these, only fragments have been preserved. They appear to have related principally to moral subjects, and, accordingly, Horace classes him with Chrysippus as a moral philosopher, and speaks of him in a manner which proves that the writings of Crantor were much read and generally known in Rome at that time.

He also made some attempts at poetry; and Diogenes Laërtius relates, that, after sealing up a collection of his poems, he deposited them in the temple of Athena in his native city, Soli. He is accordingly called by the poet Theaetetus, in an epitaph which he composed upon him, the friend of the Muses; and that his chief favorites among the poets were Homer and Euripides.

=== On Grief ===
The most popular of Crantor's works in Rome seems to have been that "On Grief" (Latin: De Luctu, Greek: Περὶ Πένθους), which was addressed to his friend Hippocles on the death of his son, and from which Cicero seems to have heavily relied upon in his Tusculan Disputations. According to Cicero, the Stoic philosopher Panaetius called it a "golden" work, which deserved to be learnt by heart word for word. Cicero also made great use of it while writing his celebrated Consolatio on the death of his daughter, Tullia. Several extracts from it are preserved in Pseudo-Plutarch's treatise on Consolation addressed to Apollonius, which has come down to us. Crantor paid special attention to ethics, and arranged "good" things in the following order - virtue, health, pleasure, riches.

=== Commentaries on Plato ===
Diogenes Laërtius says that Crantor left behind 30,000 lines of Commentaries (ύπομνήματα), but of these only fragments have been preserved. Crantor seems to have been the first member of the Platonic academy to write commentaries on the works of Plato; Proclus credits Crantor with the first commentary on the Timaeus, and Eudorus of Alexandria makes use of Crantor's work in his own commentary, which is in turn preserved by Plutarch.
