= Polemon of Ilium =

Ancient scholar and topographic commentator

Polemon of Ilium (Ancient Greek: Πολέμων ὁ Ἴλιος, fl. first half of the 2nd century BCE), also known as Polemon Periegetes (Ancient Greek: Πολέμων ὁ Περιηγητής), was an ancient Greek periegete, geographer, and antiquarian. He travelled throughout the Greek world and wrote about the places he visited. He also compiled a collection of the epigrams he saw on the monuments and votive offerings. None of these works survive, but many later writers quote from them.

== Life ==
According to the Suda, Polemon was born in the village of Glyceia in the territory of Ilium in northwestern Asia Minor. His father's name is given as Milesius in an inscription found at Delphi, but as Euegetes by the Suda. The Suda describes him as a contemporary of Ptolemy V Epiphanes and Aristophanes of Byzantium, and the scattered references in ancient sources suggest that lived between c. 230 and c. 160 BCE. Although a native of Ilium, Polemon was granted honors, including citizenship and proxenia, by several other Greek cities. The Suda says that he was "enrolled as a citizen" in Athens, and Plutarch refers to him as an Athenian; while Athenaeus says that he was also known as a Samian and a Sicyonian, among other cities. An inscription dated to 177/6 BCE names him as a proxenos of Delphi.

== Works ==
The titles of about thirty of Polemon's works are known. He traveled widely through Greece, Asia Minor, south Italy, and Sicily, to collect materials for his geographical works, in the course of which he paid particular attention to the inscriptions on votive offerings and on stone stelai, whence he obtained the nickname Stelokopas. In his travels, Polemon collected the epigrams he found into a work On the epigrams in each city (Ancient Greek: Περὶ τῶν κατὰ πόλεις ἐπιγραμμάτων). In addition, other works of his are mentioned, upon the votive offerings and monuments in the Acropolis of Athens, at Lacedaemon, at Delphi, and elsewhere, which no doubt contained copies of numerous epigrams. His works may have been a chief source of the Garland of Meleager. Athenaeus, Sextus Julius Africanus and other writers make very numerous quotations from his works. They were chiefly descriptions of different parts of Greece; some are on paintings preserved in various places, and several are controversial, among which is one against Eratosthenes.

Polemon's erudition has been admired by ancient writers and modern scholars alike. Plutarch described him as "a polymath who does not nod" in the study of Greek matters, and Sir James Frazer wrote that "his acquaintance both with the monuments and with the literature seems to have been extensive and profound." Rudolf Pfeiffer called him "an indefatigable traveller" and "an immensely learned antiquary", who had no equal in the study of Greek inscriptions until Cyriacus of Ancona in the 15th century.

== See also ==
- Polemon of Athens

== Editions and translations ==
- Preller, Ludwig, ed. (1838). Polemonis Periegetae Fragmenta. Leipzig: William Engelmann.
- Müller, Carl, ed. (1849). Fragmenta historicorum graecorum. Vol. III. Paris. pp. 108–148.
- Angelucci, Mariachiara, ed. (2022). Polemone di Ilio: i frammenti degli scritti periegetici. Stuttgart: Franz Steiner Verlag. ISBN 9783515117890.

== Sources ==
- Angelucci, Mariachiara (2011). "Polemon's Contribution to the Periegetic Literature of the II Century B.C." (PDF). Hormos. 3.
- Deichgräber, Karl (1952). "Polemon 9". Paulys Realencyclopädie der classischen Altertumswissenschaft. Vol. 21.2. Stuttgart: Alfred Druckenmüller. cols. 1289–1320.
- Donohue, Alice A. (2006). "Polemon of Ilium, Hellenistic periegetic writer". Brills New Pauly Online. Brill.
- Engels, David (2014). "Polemon von Ilion: Antiquarische Periegese und hellenistische Identitätssuche". In K. Freitag; C. Michels (eds.). Athen und / oder Alexandreia? Aspekte von Identität und Ethnizität im hellenistischen Griechenland. Köln: Böhlau. pp. 65–98.
- Frazer, James (1917). Studies in Greek Scenery, Legend and History, Selected from His Commentary on Pausanias's 'Description of Greece'. London: Macmillan and Company, Ltd.
- Pfeiffer, Rudolf (1968). History of Classical Scholarship from the Beginnings to the End of the Hellenistic Age. Oxford: Oxford University Press.
