= Axiothea of Phlius =

Ancient greek philosopher

Axiothea of Phlius (Greek: Ἀξιοθέα Φλειασία fl. c. 350 BCE) was a member of the Platonic Academy in the 4th century BCE. She is one of the two known female members of the Academy, the other being Lastheneia of Mantinea. According to Themistius, she traveled from Phlius to Athens to study under Plato after reading his Republic. According to Dicearchus, Axiothea dressed as a man during her time at Plato's Academy, though she appears to have been allowed to continue her studies after her disguise was discovered. After Plato's death she continued her studies with Speusippus, Plato's nephew.
