= Evander (philosopher) =

Ancient Greek scholarch and philosopher

Evander (or Euander) (Ancient Greek: Εὔανδρος, romanized: Eúandros), born in Phocis or Phocaea, was the pupil and successor of Lacydes, and was joint leader (scholarch) of the Academy at Athens together with Telecles.

In the final ten years of Lacydes' life (c. 215-c. 205), Evander and Telecles had helped run the Academy due to Lacydes being seriously ill. They continued running the Academy after the death of Lacydes, without formally being elected scholarchs. On Telecles' death in 167/6 BC, Evander remained scholarch for a few more years. Evander himself was succeeded by his pupil Hegesinus. Concerning the opinions and writings of this philosopher nothing is known except that he was an Academic Skeptic.

Several Pythagoreans of the name of Evander, who were natives of Croton, Metapontum, and Leontini, are mentioned by Iamblichus, and a Cretan Evander occurs in Plutarch.
