= Lastheneia of Mantinea =

Ancient Greek philosopher

Lastheneia (or Lasthenia) of Mantinea (Greek: Λασθένεια Μαντινική) was a member of the Platonic Academy in the 4th century BCE. She is one of the two known female members of the Academy, the other being Axiothea of Phlius. She was born in Mantinea, in the Peloponnese. After the death of Plato she continued her studies with Speusippus, Plato's nephew. She is also said to have had a relationship with Speusippus.
