= Arcesilaus =

3rd-century BC Greek Hellenistic philosopher

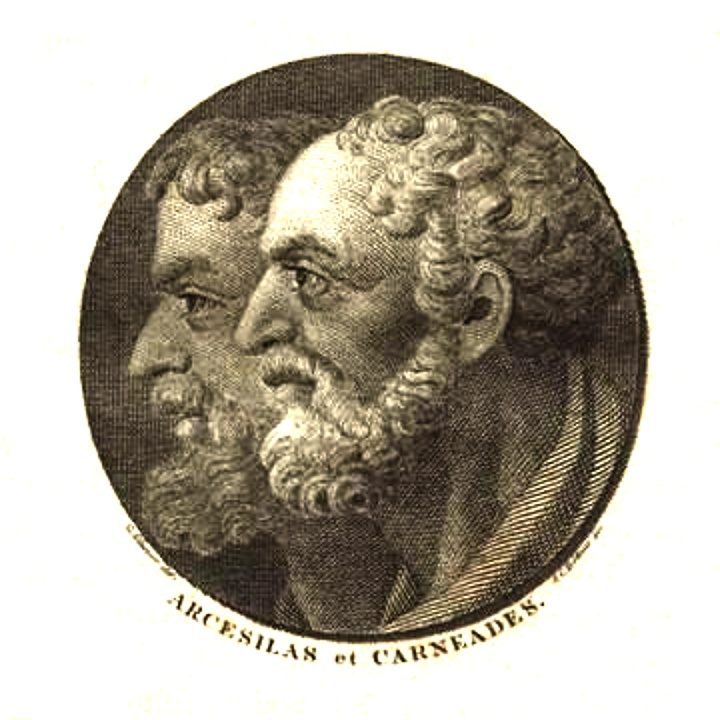
- Arcesilaus and Carneades
- Born: 316/5 BC; Pitane, Aeolis (modern-day Çandarlı, Izmir, Turkey)
- Died: 241/0 BC; Athens (modern-day Greece)

Philosophical work
- Era: Hellenistic philosophy
- Region: Western philosophy
- School: Academic Skepticism
- Main interests: Epistemology
- Notable ideas: Founder of Academic Skepticism

Arcesilaus (/ˌɑːrsɛsɪˈleɪ.əs/; Ancient Greek: Ἀρκεσίλαος; 316/5–241/0 BC) was a Greek Hellenistic philosopher. He was the founder of Academic Skepticism and what is variously called the Second or Middle or New Academy – the phase of the Platonic Academy in which it embraced philosophical skepticism.

Arcesilaus succeeded Crates of Athens as the sixth scholarch of the academy around 264 BC. He did not preserve his thoughts in writing, so his opinions can only be gleaned second-hand from what is preserved by later writers.

In Athens Arcesilaus interacted with the Pyrrhonist philosopher, Timon of Phlius, whose philosophy appears to have influenced Arcesilaus to become the first Academic to adopt a position of philosophical skepticism, that is, he doubted the ability of the senses to discover truth about the world, although he may have continued to believe in the existence of truth itself. This brought in the skeptical phase of the academy. His chief opponent was his contemporary, Zeno of Citium, the founder of Stoicism, whose dogma of katalepsis (i.e., that reality could be comprehended with certainty) Arcesilaus denied.

== Life ==
Arcesilaus was born in Pitane in Aeolis. His early education was provided by Autolycus the mathematician, with whom he migrated to Sardis. Afterwards, he studied rhetoric in Athens. He then studied philosophy, becoming a disciple first of Theophrastus and afterwards of Crantor. He also attended the school of Pyrrho, whose philosophy he maintained, except in name. He subsequently became intimate with Polemo and Crates of Athens, who made Arcesilaus his successor as scholarch (head) of the Platonic Academy.

Diogenes Laërtius says that, like his successor Lacydes, Arcesilaus died of excessive drinking, but the testimony of others (e.g. Cleanthes, who said that he lived a dutiful life) and his own precepts discredit the story. He is known to have been much respected by the Athenians.

== Philosophy ==
Arcesilaus committed nothing to writing. His opinions were imperfectly known to his contemporaries, and can now only be gathered from the statements of later writers. This makes his philosophy difficult to evaluate and partly inconsistent. This led scholars to see his skepticism in several ways. Some see his philosophy as completely negative or destructive of all philosophical views. Others regard him as taking the position that nothing can be known on the basis of his philosophical arguments. Others claimed he held no positive views on any philosophical topic, including the possibility of knowledge.

Arcesilaus' contemporary, Aristo of Chios, described Arcesilaus as being: "Plato the head of him, Pyrrho the tail, midway Diodorus" meaning that Arcesilaus presented himself as a Platonist, the substance of what he taught was the dialectics of Diodorus, but his actual philosophy was that of Pyrrhonism. Eusebius, probably quoting Aristocles of Messene, reported that Arcesilaus studied in Pyrrho's school and adhered, except in name, to Pyrrhonism. Numenius of Apamea said "Arcesilaus accompanied Pyrrho. He remained Pyrrhonist in his rejection of everything, except in name. At least the Pyrrhonists Mnaseas, Philomelos and Timon call him a Pyrrhonist, just as they were themselves, because he too rejected the true, the false, and the persuasive." Sextus Empiricus said that Arcesilaus' philosophy appeared essentially the same as Pyrrhonism, but granted that this might have been superficial.

On the one hand, Arcesilaus professed to be no innovator, but a reviver of the dogma-free dialectic that had characterized the academy under Plato. Thus he is said to have restored the doctrines of Plato in an uncorrupted form. On the other hand, according to Cicero, he summed up his opinions in the formula, "that he knew nothing, not even his own ignorance." There are two ways of reconciling the difficulty: either we may suppose him to have thrown out such aphorisms as an exercise for his pupils, as Sextus Empiricus, who calls him a "skeptic", would have us believe; or he may have really doubted the esoteric meaning of Plato, and have supposed himself to have been stripping his works of the figments of the Dogmatists, while he was in fact taking from them all certain principles.

Cicero attributes the following argument to Arcesilaus:

(i) it is rash and shameful to assent to something false or unknown, but since (ii) nothing can be known (and obviously we shouldn't do what is rash and shameful), (iii) we should suspend judgment about everything

Zeno of Citium and the other Stoics were the chief opponents of Arcesilaus. He attacked their dogma of katalêptikê phantasia (i.e., a convincing conception) as understood to be a mean between episteme (knowledge) and doxa (opinion). He argued that this mean could not exist. It involved a contradiction in terms, as the very idea of phantasia implied the possibility of false as well as true conceptions of the same object. As such, it was merely the interpolation of a name.

== Commentary on Arcesilaus ==
The Pyrrhonist philosopher and contemporary of Arcesilaus, Timon of Phlius ridiculed Arcesilaus in his Silloi, but also praised him in Funeral Banquet of Arcesilaus. Fragments from Timon about Arcesilaus include:

- "Having the lead of Menedemus at his heart, he will run either to that mass of flesh, Pyrrho, or to Diodorus."
- "I shall swim to Pyrrho and to crooked Diodorus."
- "And mixing sound sense with wily cavils."

The Greek Middle Platonist philosopher, historian, biographer, essayist, and priest Plutarch wrote (Adversus Colotem, section 26):

"But the reputation of Arcesilaus, who was the best beloved and most esteemed of all the philosophers in his time, seems to have been no small eyesore to Epicurus; who says of him that, delivering nothing peculiar to himself or of his own invention, he imprinted in illiterate men an opinion and esteem of his being very knowing and learned. Now Arcesilaus was so far from desiring any glory by being a bringer-in of new opinions, and from arrogating to himself those of the ancients, that the sophisters of that time blamed him for attributing to Socrates, Plato, Parmenides, and Heraclitus the doctrines concerning the retention of assent, and the incomprehensibility of things; having no need so to do, but only that he might strengthen them and render them recommendable by ascribing them to such illustrious personages."

Blaise Pascal wrote of Arcesilaus in his Pensées (1669, para. 375):

I have seen changes in all nations and men, and thus after many changes of judgement regarding true justice, I have recognized that our nature was but in continual change, and I have not changed since; and if I changed, I would confirm my opinion. The skeptic Arcesilaus, who became a dogmatist.

Eusebius wrote of Arcesilaus in his Preparation for the Gospel (14.6.1) "Keen sophist, slayer of men unskilled in fence." (Translation by Edwin Hamilton Gifford, 2002)

== Sources ==
- Dorandi, Tiziano (1999). "Chapter 2: Chronology". In Algra, Keimpe; et al. (eds.). The Cambridge History of Hellenistic Philosophy. Cambridge: Cambridge University Press. p. 48. ISBN 978-0521250283.
- Simone Vezzoli, Arcesilao di Pitane. L'origine del platonismo neoaccademico (Philosophie hellénistique et romaine, 1), Turnhout: Brepols Publishers, 2016, ISBN 978-2503550299
