= Polemon of Athens =

Greek philosopher and scholarch (died 270/269 BC)

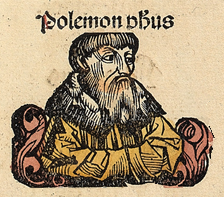
- Polemon, depicted as a medieval scholar in the Nuremberg Chronicle
- Died: c. 270 B.C.

Philosophical work
- Institutions: Platonic Academy (scholarch)

Polemon of Athens (Ancient Greek: Πολέμων, gen.: Πολέμωνος; d. 270/269 BC) was an eminent Greek Platonist philosopher and Plato's third successor as scholarch (i.e., head of the Academy) from 314/313 to 270/269 BC. A pupil of Xenocrates, he believed that philosophy should be practiced rather than just studied, and he placed the highest good in living according to nature.

== Life ==
Polemon was the son of Philostratus, a man of wealth and political distinction. In his youth, he was relatively irresponsible, but one day, when he was about thirty, on his bursting into the school of Xenocrates, at the head of a band of revelers, his attention was drawn to the sayings of Xenocrates, who continued on calmly in spite of the interruption; it just so happened that Xenocrates was discussing temperance. Polemon immediately tore off his garland and remained an attentive listener, and from that day he adopted a modest and restrained course of life, and continued to frequent the school. On the death of Xenocrates, he became the scholarch, in 315 BC.

His disciples included Crates of Athens, who was his eromenos, and Crantor, as well as Zeno of Citium and Arcesilaus. According to Eusebius (Chron.) he died in 270/269 BC (or possibly, as in some manuscripts, 276/275 BC). Diogenes Laërtius says that he died at a great age, and of natural decay. Crates was his successor in the Academy.

== Philosophy ==
Diogenes Laërtius reports that he was a close follower of Xenocrates in all things. He esteemed the object of philosophy to be to exercise people in things and deeds, not in dialectic speculations; his character was grave and severe; and he took pride in displaying the mastery which he had acquired over emotions of every sort. In literature he most admired Homer and Sophocles, and he is said to have been the author of the remark, that Homer is an epic Sophocles, and Sophocles a tragic Homer.

== Writings ==
According to Diogenes Laërtius, Polemon wrote several treatises, of which none were extant when the Suda was compiled. There is, however, a quotation made by Clement of Alexandria, either from Polemon or from another philosopher of the same name, "in Concerning the Life in Accordance with Nature" (Greek: ἐν τοῖς περὶ τοῦ κατὰ φύσιν βίου), and another passage, upon happiness, which agrees precisely with the statement of Cicero, that Polemon placed the summum bonum (highest good) in living according to the laws of nature.

== See also ==
- Polemon of Ilium

== Sources ==
=== Primary ===
- Diogenes Laërtius, Lives and Opinions of Eminent Philosophers iv. 16-20 (with the commentary of Gilles Ménage)
  - Laërtius, Diogenes. "The Academics: Polemo" . Lives of the Eminent Philosophers. Vol. 1:4. Translated by Hicks, Robert Drew (Two volume ed.). Loeb Classical Library. § 16–21.
  - Laërtius, Diogenes. "The Stoics: Zeno" . Lives of the Eminent Philosophers. Vol. 2:7. Translated by Hicks, Robert Drew (Two volume ed.). Loeb Classical Library. § 2, 25.
- Suda, Polemon
- Plutarch, de Adul. et Amic. 32, p. 71e
- Lucian, Bis Accusat. 16, vol. ii. p. 811
- Athenaeus, Deipnosophistae ii., p. 44e
- Cicero, Academica i. 9, ii. 35, 42; De Oratore iii. 18; de Finibus ii. 6, 11, iv. 2, 6, 16, 18, v. 1, 5, 7, and elsewhere
- Horace, Sermones ii. 3. 253ff.
- Valerius Maximus, vi. 9
