= Scholarch =

Head of an Ancient Greek philosophic school

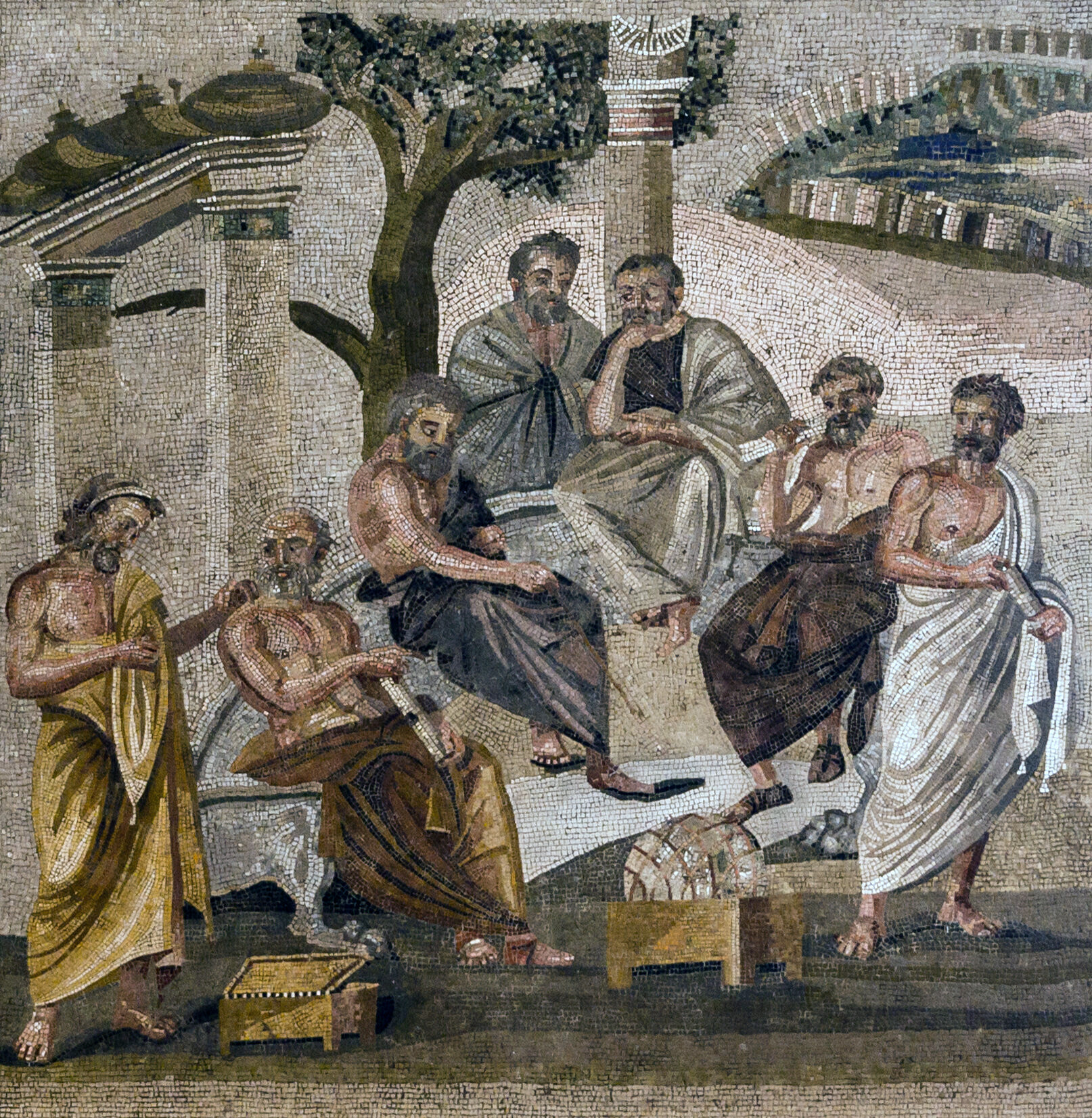
Academy mosaic from Pompeii

A scholarch (Ancient Greek: σχολάρχης, scholarchēs) was the head of a school in ancient Greece. The term is especially remembered for its use to mean the heads of schools of philosophy, such as the Platonic Academy in ancient Athens. Its first scholarch was Plato himself, the founder and proprietor. He held the position for forty years, appointing his nephew Speusippus as his successor. The members of the Academy elected later scholarchs.

A list of scholarchs of the four main philosophy schools during the Hellenistic period, with the approximate dates they headed the schools, is as follows:

Academy	Lyceum	Stoa	Garden
388–348 Plato; 348–339 Speusippus; 339–314 Xenocrates; 314–270 Polemon; 270–265 Crates of Athens; 265–241 Arcesilaus; 241–225 Lacydes; 225–167 Telecles & Euander; 167–165 Hegesinus; 165–137 Carneades; 137–131 Carneades II; 131–127 Crates of Tarsus; 127–110 Clitomachus; 110–84 Philo of Larissa	335–322 Aristotle; 322–287 Theophrastus; 287–269 Strato; 269–225 Lyco; 225–??? Aristo c. 155 Critolaus ???–110 Diodorus of Tyre c.110 Erymneus fl. 44 Cratippus of Pergamon	300–262 Zeno of Citium; 262–230 Cleanthes; 230–205 Chrysippus; 205–??? Zeno of Tarsus ???–145 Diogenes; 145–129 Antipater; 129–110 Panaetius	307–271 Epicurus; 271–250 Hermarchus; 250–215 Polystratus; 215–201 Dionysius; 201–??? Basilides c. 175 Thespis ???–100 Apollodorus; 100–75 Zeno of Sidon; 75–70 Phaedrus; 70–??? Patro
