= Lacydes of Cyrene =

Ancient Greek Academic Skeptic philosopher

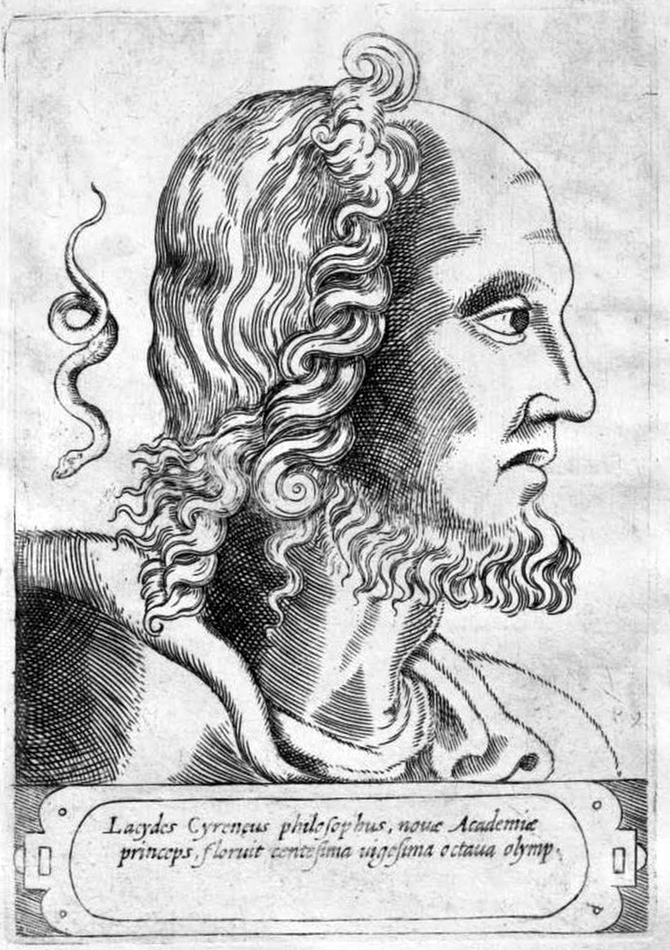
Lacydes of Cyrene, 1580

Lacydes of Cyrene (Ancient Greek: Λακύδης ὁ Κυρηναῖος), Academic Skeptic philosopher, was head of the Platonic Academy at Athens in succession to Arcesilaus from 241 BC. He was forced to resign c. 215 BC due to ill-health, and he died c. 205 BC. Nothing survives of his works.

== Life ==
He was born in Cyrene, the son of Alexander. In his youth he was poor, but remarkable for his industry, as well as for his affable and engaging manners. He moved to Athens, and attached himself to the Middle Academy, according to a silly story quoted by Eusebius from Numenius, because the ease with which his servants robbed him without being detected, convinced him that no reliance could be placed on the evidence of the senses. He was a disciple of Arcesilaus, and succeeded him as head (scholarch) of the school in 241 BC, over which he presided for 26 years. The place where his instructions were delivered was a garden, named the Lacydeum (Greek: Λακύδειον), provided for the purpose by his friend Attalus I of Pergamon. He resigned his position in 216/5 BC, because of ill-health, and for the final ten years of his life the Academy was run by a council led by Evander and Telecles, who succeeded him to jointly run the Academy after his death in 206/5 BC. According to Diogenes Laërtius he died from excessive drinking, but the story is discredited by the eulogy of Eusebius that he was in all things moderate.

== Philosophy ==
In his philosophical views he followed Arcesilaus closely. He is said to have written treatises, including one entitled On Nature, but nothing survives. Apart from a number of anecdotes distinguished for their sarcastic humour, Lacydes has the reputation of a man of refined character, a hard worker, and an accomplished orator.
