= Xenocrates =

4th-century BC Greek philosopher, mathematician and scholarch

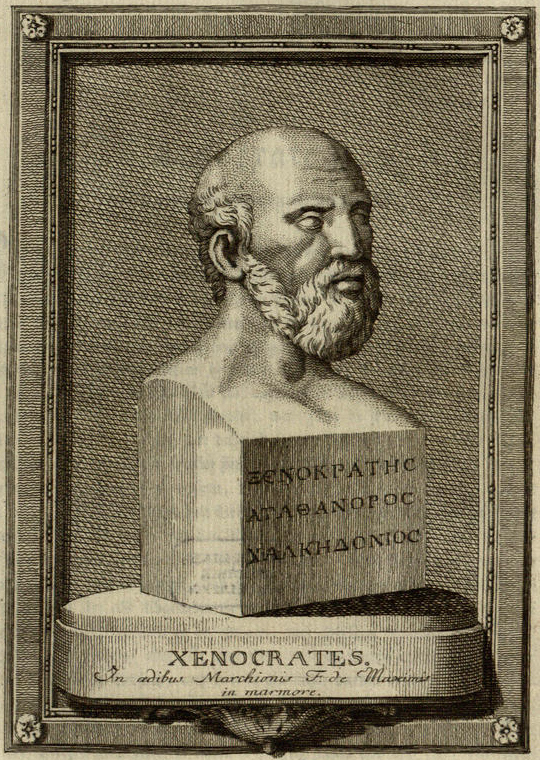
- Xenocrates
- Born: 396/5 BC; Chalcedon
- Died: 314/3 BC; Athens

Philosophical work
- Era: Ancient philosophy
- Region: Western philosophy
- School: Platonism
- Main interests: Logic, physics, metaphysics, epistemology, mathematics, ethics
- Notable ideas: Developed the philosophy of Plato

Xenocrates (/zəˈnɒkrəˌtiːz/; Greek: Ξενοκράτης; c. 396/5 – 314/3 BC) of Chalcedon was a Greek philosopher, mathematician, and leader (scholarch) of the Platonic Academy from 339/8 to 314/3 BC. His teachings followed those of Plato, which he attempted to define more closely, often with mathematical elements. He distinguished three forms of being: the sensible, the intelligible, and a third compounded of the two, to which correspond respectively, sense, intellect and opinion. He considered unity and duality to be gods which rule the universe, and the soul a self-moving number. God pervades all things, and there are daemonical powers, intermediate between the divine and the mortal, which consist in conditions of the soul. He held that mathematical objects and the Platonic Ideas are identical, unlike Plato who distinguished them. In ethics, he taught that virtue produces happiness, but external goods can minister to it and enable it to effect its purpose.

== Life ==
Xenocrates was a native of Chalcedon. By the most probable calculation he was born 396/5 BC, and died 314/3 BC at the age of 82. His father was named Agathon (Ancient Greek: Ἀγάθων) or Agathanor (Ancient Greek: Ἀγαθάνωρ).

Moving to Athens in early youth, he became the pupil of Aeschines Socraticus, but subsequently joined himself to Plato, whom he accompanied to Sicily in 361. Upon his master's death, he paid a visit with Aristotle to Hermias of Atarneus. In 339/8 BC, Xenocrates succeeded Speusippus in the presidency of the school, defeating his competitors Menedemus of Pyrrha and Heraclides Ponticus by a few votes. On three occasions he was member of an Athenian legation, once to Philip, twice to Antipater.

Xenocrates resented the Macedonian influence then dominant at Athens. Soon after the death of Demosthenes (c. 322 BC), he declined the citizenship offered to him at the insistence of Phocion as a reward for his services in negotiating peace with Antipater after Athens' unsuccessful rebellion. The settlement was reached "at the price of a constitutional change: thousands of poor Athenians were disenfranchised," and Xenocrates said "that he did not want to become a citizen within a constitution he had struggled to prevent". Being unable to pay the tax levied upon resident aliens, he is said to have been saved only by the courage of the orator Lycurgus, or even to have been bought by Demetrius Phalereus, and then emancipated. In 314/3, he died from hitting his head, after tripping over a bronze pot in his house.

Xenocrates was succeeded as scholarch by Polemon, whom he had reclaimed from a life of profligacy. Besides Polemon, the statesman Phocion, Chaeron (tyrant of Pellene), the academic Crantor, the Stoic Zeno and Epicurus are said to have frequented his lectures.

He was described as lacking a natural social grace, he was known for his steady and thorough work habits. His peers in Athens viewed him as a person of high integrity and character, which led people to trust him in public life.

Xenocrates adhered closely to the Platonist doctrine, and he is accounted the typical representative of the Old Academy. In his writings, which were numerous, he seems to have covered nearly the whole of the Academic program; but metaphysics and ethics were the subjects which principally engaged his thoughts. He is said to have made more explicit the division of philosophy into the three parts of Physics, Dialectic and Ethics.

== Writings ==
With a comprehensive work on Dialectic (τῆς περὶ τὸ διαλέγεσθαι πραγματείας βιβλία ιδ΄) there were also separate treatises On Knowledge, On Knowledgibility (περὶ ἐπιστήμης α΄, περὶ ἐπιστημοσύνης α΄), On Divisions (διαιρέσεις η΄), On Genera and Species (περὶ γενῶν καὶ εἰδῶν α΄), On Ideas (περὶ ἰδεῶν), On the Opposite (περὶ τοῦ ἐναντίου), and others, to which probably the work On Mediate Thought (τῶν περὶ τὴν διάνοιαν η΄) also belonged. Two works by Xenocrates on Physics are mentioned (περὶ φύσεως ϛ΄ - φυσικῆς ἀκροάσεως ϛ΄), as are also books On the Gods (περὶ Θεῶν β΄), On the Existent (περὶ τοῦ ὄντος), On the One (περὶ τοῦ ἑνός), On the Indefinite (περὶ τοῦ ἀορίστου), On the Soul (περὶ ψυχῆς), On the Emotions (περὶ τῶν παθῶν α΄) On Memory (περὶ μνήμης), etc. In like manner, with the more general Ethical treatises On Happiness (περὶ εὐδαιμονίας β΄), and On Virtue (περὶ ἀρετῆς) there were connected separate books on individual Virtues, on the Voluntary, etc. His four books on Royalty he had addressed to Alexander (στοιχεῖα πρὸς Ἀλέξανδρον περὶ βασιλείας δ΄). Besides these he had written treatises On the State (περὶ πολιτείας α΄; πολιτικός α΄), On the Power of Law (περὶ δυνάμεως νόμου α΄), etc., as well as upon Geometry, Arithmetic, and Astrology. Besides philosophical treatises, he wrote poetry (epē) and paraenesis.

== Philosophy ==
=== Epistemology ===
Xenocrates made a more definite division between the three departments of philosophy, than Speusippus, but at the same time abandoned Plato's heuristic method of conducting through doubts (aporiai), and adopted instead a mode of bringing forward his doctrines in which they were developed dogmatically.

Xenocrates recognized three grades of cognition, each appropriated to a region of its own: knowledge, sensation, and opinion. He referred knowledge (episteme) to that essence which is the object of pure thought, and is not included in the phenomenal world; sensation (aisthesis) to that which passes into the world of phenomena; opinion (doxa) to that essence which is at once the object of sensuous perception, and, mathematically, of pure reason - the essence of heaven or the stars; so that he conceived of doxa in a higher sense, and endeavored, more definitely than Plato, to exhibit mathematics as mediating between knowledge and sensuous perception.

All three modes of apprehension partake of truth; but in what manner scientific perception (epistemonike aisthesis) did so, we unfortunately do not learn. Even here Xenocrates's preference for symbolic modes of sensualising or denoting appears: he connected the above three stages of knowledge with the three Fates: Atropos, Clotho, and Lachesis. We know nothing further about the mode in which Xenocrates carried out his dialectic, as it is probable that what was peculiar to Aristotelian logic did not remain unnoticed in it, for it can hardly be doubted that the division of the existent into the absolutely existent, and the relatively existent, attributed to Xenocrates, was opposed to the Aristotelian table of categories.

=== Metaphysics ===
We know from Plutarch that Xenocrates, if he did not explain the Platonic construction of the world-soul as Crantor after him did, nevertheless drew heavily on the Timaeus; and further that he was at the head of those who, regarding the universe as unoriginated and imperishable, looked upon the chronological succession in the Platonic theory as a form in which to denote the relations of conceptual succession. Plutarch unfortunately, does not give us any further details, and contented himself with describing the well-known assumption of Xenocrates, that the soul is a self-moving number. Probably we should connect with this the statement that Xenocrates called unity and duality (monas and duas) deities, and characterised the former as the first male existence, ruling in heaven, as father and Zeus, as uneven number and spirit; the latter as female, as the mother of the gods, and as the soul of the universe which reigns over the mutable world under heaven, or, as others have it, that he named the Zeus who ever remains like himself, governing in the sphere of the immutable, the highest; the one who rules over the mutable, sublunary world, the last, or outermost.

If, like other Platonists, he designated the material principle as undefined duality, the world-soul was probably described by him as the first defined duality, the conditioning or defining principle of every separate definitude in the sphere of the material and changeable, but not extending beyond it. He appears to have called it in the highest sense the individual soul, in a derivative sense a self-moving number, that is, the first number endowed with motion. To this world-soul Zeus, or the world-spirit, has entrusted - in what degree and in what extent, we do not learn - dominion over that which is liable to motion and change. The divine power of the world-soul is then again represented, in the different spheres of the universe, as infusing soul into the planets, Sun and Moon, - in a purer form, in the shape of Olympic gods. As a sublunary daemonical power (as Hera, Poseidon, Demeter), it dwells in the elements, and these daemonical natures, midway between gods and men, are related to them as the isosceles triangle is to the equilateral and the scalene. The divine world-soul which reigns over the whole domain of sublunary changes he appears to have designated as the last Zeus, the last divine activity.

It is not until we get to the sphere of the separate daemonical powers of nature that the opposition between good and evil begins, and the daemonical power is appeased by means of a stubbornness which it finds there congenial to it; the good daemonical power makes happy those in whom it takes up its abode, the bad ruins them; for eudaimonia is the indwelling of a good daemon, the opposite the indwelling of a bad one.

How Xenocrates tried to establish and connect scientifically these assumptions, which appear to be taken chiefly from his books on the nature of the gods, we do not learn, and can only discover the one fundamental idea at the basis of them, that all grades of existence are penetrated by divine power, and that this grows less and less energetic in proportion as it descends to the perishable and individual. Hence he also appears to have maintained that as far as consciousness extends, so far also extends an intuition of that all-ruling divine power, of which he represented even irrational animals as partaking. But neither the thick nor the thin, to the different combinations of which he appears to have tried to refer the various grades of material existence, were regarded by him as in themselves partaking of soul; doubtless because he referred them immediately to the divine activity, and was far from attempting to reconcile the duality of the principia, or to resolve them into an original unity. Hence too he was for proving the incorporeality of the soul by the fact that it is not nourished as the body is.

It is probable, that, after the example of Plato, he designated the divine principium as alone indivisible, and remaining like itself; the material, as the divisible, partaking of multiformity, and different, and that from the union of the two, or from the limitation of the unlimited by the absolute unity, he deduced number, and for that reason called the soul of the universe, like that of individual beings, a self-moving number, which, by virtue of its twofold root in the same and the different, shares equally in permanence and motion, and attains to consciousness by means of the reconciliation of this opposition.

Aristotle, in his Metaphysics, recognized amongst contemporary Platonists three principal views concerning the ideal numbers, and their relation to the ideas and to mathematical numbers:

1. those who, like Plato, distinguished ideal and mathematical numbers;
2. those who, like Xenocrates, identified ideal numbers with mathematical numbers
3. those who, like Speusippus, postulated mathematical numbers only

Aristotle has much to say against the Xenocratean interpretation of the theory, and in particular points out that, if the ideal numbers are made up of arithmetical units, they not only cease to be principles, but also become subject to arithmetical operations.

In the derivation of things according to the series of the numbers he seems to have gone further than any of his predecessors. He approximated to the Pythagoreans in this, that (as is clear from his explanation of the soul) he regarded number as the conditioning principle of consciousness, and consequently of knowledge also; he thought it necessary, however, to supply what was wanting in the Pythagorean assumption by the more accurate definition, borrowed from Plato, that it is only insofar as number reconciles the opposition between the same and the different, and has raised itself to self-motion, that it is soul. We find a similar attempt at the supplementation of the Platonic doctrine in Xenocrates's assumption of indivisible lines. In them he thought he had discovered what, according to Plato, God alone knows, and he among men who is loved by him, namely, the elements or principia of the Platonic triangles. He seems to have described them as first, original lines, and in a similar sense to have spoken of original plain figures and bodies, convinced that the principia of the existent should be sought not in the material, not in the divisible which attains to the condition of a phenomenon, but merely in the ideal definitude of form. He may very well, in accordance with this, have regarded the point as a merely subjectively admissible presupposition, and a passage of Aristotle respecting this assumption should perhaps be referred to him.

=== Ethics ===
The information on his Ethics is scanty. He tried to supplement the Platonic doctrine at various points, and at the same time to give it a more direct applicability to life. He distinguished from the good and the bad something which is neither good nor bad. Following the ideas of his Academic predecessors, he viewed the good as that which should be striven after for itself, that is, which has value in itself, while the bad is the opposite of this. Consequently, that which is neither good nor bad is what in itself is neither to be striven after nor to be avoided, but derives value or the opposite according as it serves as means for what is good or bad, or rather, is used by us for that purpose.

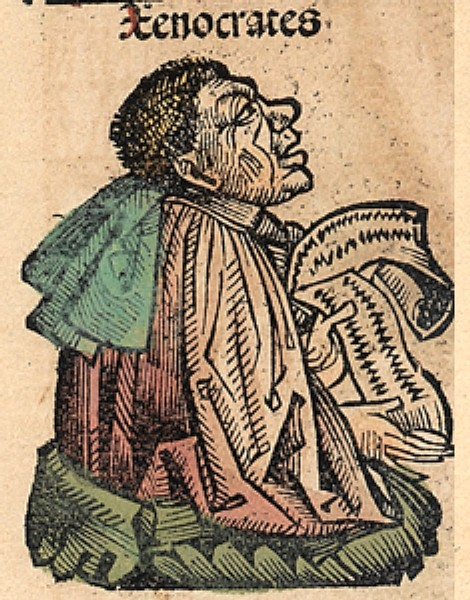
Xenocrates, depicted as a medieval scholar in the Nuremberg Chronicle

While, however, Xenocrates (and with him Speusippus and the other philosophers of the older Academy) would not accept that these intermediate things, such as health, beauty, fame, good fortune, etc. were valuable in themselves, he did not accept that they were absolutely worthless or indifferent. According, therefore, as what belongs to the intermediate region is adapted to bring about or to hinder the good, Xenocrates appears to have designated it as good or evil, probably with the proviso, that by misuse what is good might become evil, and vice versa, that by virtue, what is evil might become good.

Still he maintained that virtue alone is valuable in itself, and that the value of every thing else is conditional. According to this, happiness should coincide with the consciousness of virtue, though its reference to the relations of human life requires the additional condition, that it is only in the enjoyment of the good things and circumstances originally designed for it by nature that it attains to completion; to these good things, however, sensuous gratification does not belong. In this sense he on the one hand denoted (perfect) happiness as the possession of personal virtue, and the capabilities adapted to it, and therefore reckoned among its constituent elements, besides moral actions conditions and facilities, those movements and relations also without which external good things cannot be attained, and on the other hand did not allow that wisdom, understood as the science of first causes or intelligible essence, or as theoretical understanding, is by itself the true wisdom which should be striven after by people, and therefore seems to have regarded this human wisdom as at the same time exerted in investigating, defining, and applying. How decidedly he insisted not only on the recognition of the unconditional nature of moral excellence, but on morality of thought, is shown by his declaration, that it comes to the same thing whether one casts longing eyes, or sets one's feet upon the property of others. His moral earnestness is also expressed in the warning that the ears of children should be guarded against the poison of immoral speeches.

=== Mathematics ===
Xenocrates is known to have written a book On Numbers, and a Theory of Numbers, besides books on geometry. Plutarch writes that Xenocrates once attempted to find the total number of syllables that could be made from the letters of the alphabet. According to Plutarch, Xenocrates result was 1,002,000,000,000 (a "myriad-and-twenty times a myriad-myriad"). This possibly represents the first instance that a combinatorial problem involving permutations was attempted. Xenocrates also supported the idea of "indivisible lines" (and magnitudes) in order to counter Zeno's paradoxes.

== See also ==
- On Indivisible Lines

== Bibliography ==
- Bartninkas, V. (2023). Traditional and Cosmic Gods in Later Plato and the Early Academy Cambridge: Cambridge University Press, 211–238. ISBN 9781009322591
- Dorandi, Tiziano (1999). "Chapter 2: Chronology". In Algra, Keimpe; et al. (eds.). The Cambridge History of Hellenistic Philosophy. Cambridge: Cambridge University Press. p. 50. ISBN 9780521250283.
- Jackson, Henry (1911). "Xenocrates" . In Chisholm, Hugh (ed.). Encyclopædia Britannica. Vol. 28 (11th ed.). Cambridge University Press. pp. 883–884.
- Laërtius, Diogenes. "The Academics: Xenocrates" . Lives of the Eminent Philosophers. Vol. 1:4. Translated by Hicks, Robert Drew (Two volume ed.). Loeb Classical Library.
- Habicht, Christian (1988). "Hellenistic Athens and her Philosophers". David Magie Lecture, Princeton University Program in the History, Archaeology, and Religions of the Ancient World. p. 14.
- Plutarch (1902). "Phoc § 29.6". Academicorum philosophorum index Herculanensis. Apud Weidmannos. p. 42.
- Whitehead (1981). "Xenocrates the Metic". Rheinisches Museum. 124: 238–241.

Attribution
