= Hegesinus of Pergamon =

Ancient Greek Academic Skeptic philosopher

Hegesinus of Pergamon (Ancient Greek: Ἡγησίνους, romanized: Hēgēsínous), was an Academic Skeptic philosopher from Pergamon. He was the successor of Evander and the immediate predecessor of Carneades as the leader (scholarch) of the Platonic Academy, and served for a period around 160 BC. Nothing else is known about him.
