= Platonic Academy =

Educative center founded by Plato

Coordinates: 37°59′33″N 23°42′29″E

The Academy (Ancient Greek: Ἀκαδημία, romanized: Akadēmia) was founded by Plato in ca. 387 BC in Athens. Aristotle studied there for twenty years (367 BC – 347 BC) before founding his own school, the Lyceum. The academy persisted throughout the Hellenistic period as a skeptical school, until coming to an end after the death of Philo of Larissa in 83 BC. Although philosophers continued to teach Plato's philosophy in Athens during the Roman era, it was not until AD 410 that a revived Academy was re-established as a center for Neoplatonism, persisting until 529 AD when it was closed down by Justinian I.

The academy is regarded as the first institution of higher education in the West, where subjects as diverse as biology, geography, astronomy, mathematics, history, and many more were taught and investigated. It has been regarded as perhaps the earliest structured academy for political science in antiquity.

== Site ==
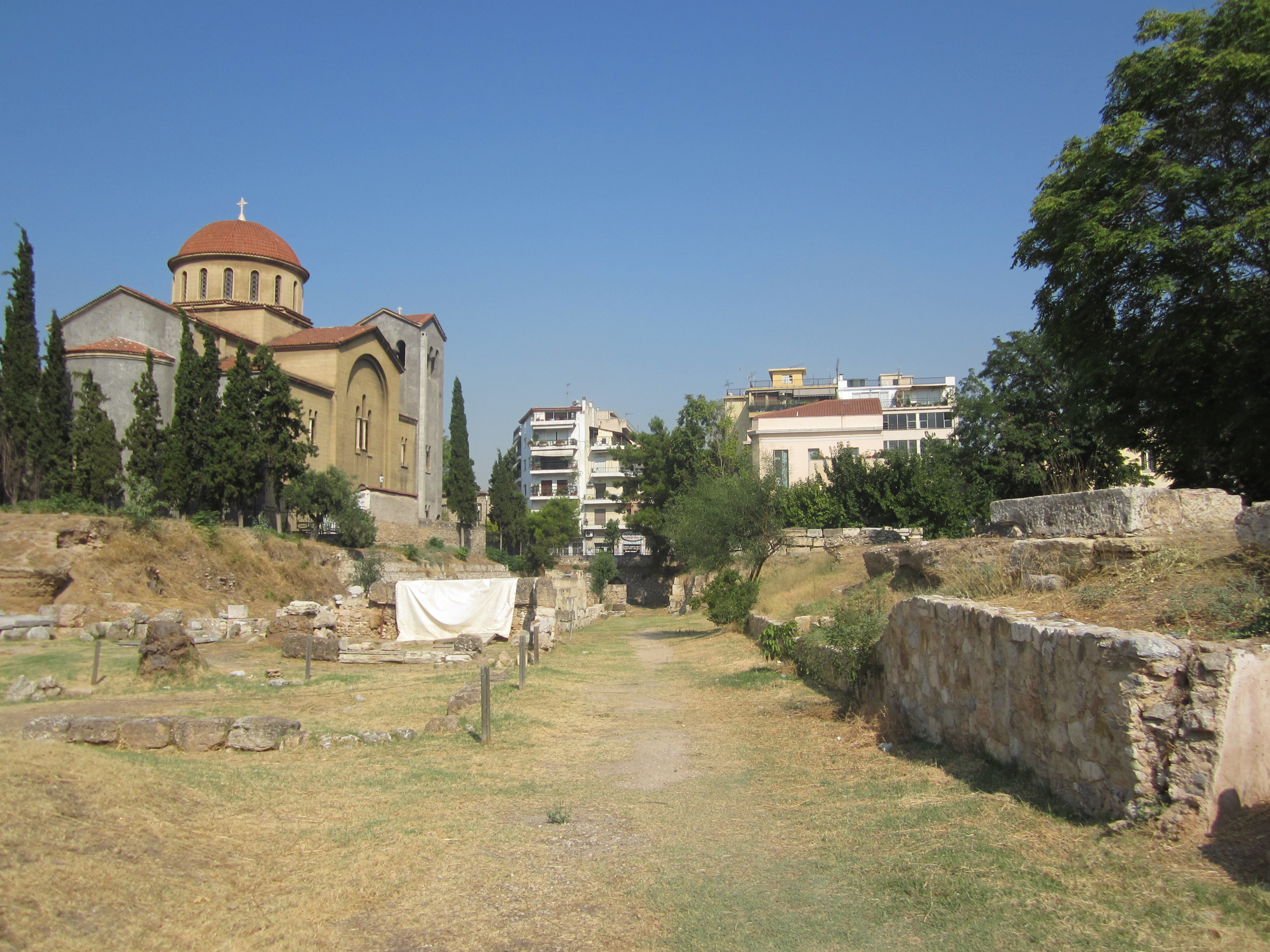
Ancient road to the academy.

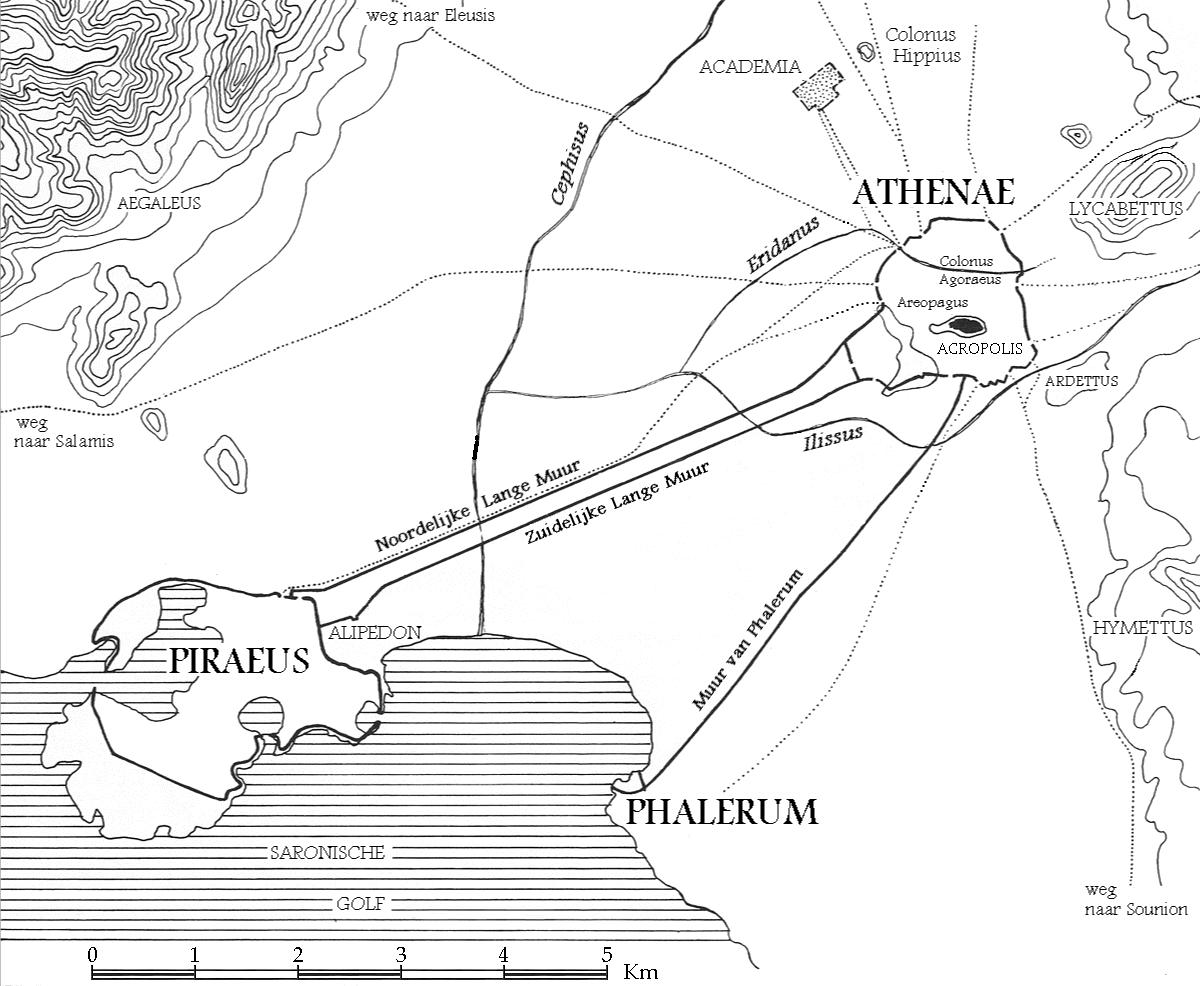
Map of Ancient Athens. The academy is north of Athens.

Before the Akademia was a school, and even before Cimon enclosed its precincts with a wall, it contained a sacred grove of olive trees dedicated to Athena, the goddess of wisdom, outside the city walls of ancient Athens. The archaic name for the site was Hekademia (Ἑκαδήμεια), which by classical times evolved into Akademia and was explained, at least as early as the beginning of the 6th century BC, by linking it to an Athenian hero, a legendary "Akademos".

The site of the academy was sacred to Athena and other immortals; it had sheltered her religious cult since the Bronze Age, a cult that was perhaps also associated with the hero-gods the Dioscuri (Castor and Polydeuces), for the hero Akademos associated with the site was credited with revealing to the Divine Twins where Theseus had hidden Helen. Out of respect for its long tradition and the association with the Dioscuri, the Spartans would not ravage these original "groves of Academe" when they invaded Attica, a piety not shared by the Roman Sulla, who axed the sacred olive trees of Athena in 86 BC to build siege engines.

Among the religious observances that took place at the Akademeia was a torchlit night race from altars within the city to Prometheus' altar in the Akademeia. Funeral games also took place in the area as well as a Dionysiac procession from Athens to the Hekademeia and then back to the polis. The road to Akademeia was lined with the gravestones of Athenians.

The site of the academy is located near Colonus, approximately, 1.5 km north of Athens' Dipylon gates. The site was rediscovered in the 20th century, in modern Akadimia Platonos neighbourhood; considerable excavation has been accomplished and visiting the site is free.

== Plato's Academy ==
What was later to be known as Plato's school probably originated around the time Plato acquired inherited property at the age of thirty, with informal gatherings which included Theaetetus of Sunium, Archytas of Tarentum, Leodamas of Thasos, and Neoclides. According to Debra Nails, Speusippus "joined the group in about 390." She claims, "It is not until Eudoxus of Cnidos arrives in the mid-380s that Eudemus recognizes a formal Academy." There is no historical record of the exact time the school was officially founded, but modern scholars generally agree that the time was the mid-380s, probably sometime after 387, when Plato is thought to have returned from his first visit to Italy and Sicily. Originally, the location of the meetings was Plato's property as often as it was the nearby Academy gymnasium; this remained so throughout the fourth century.

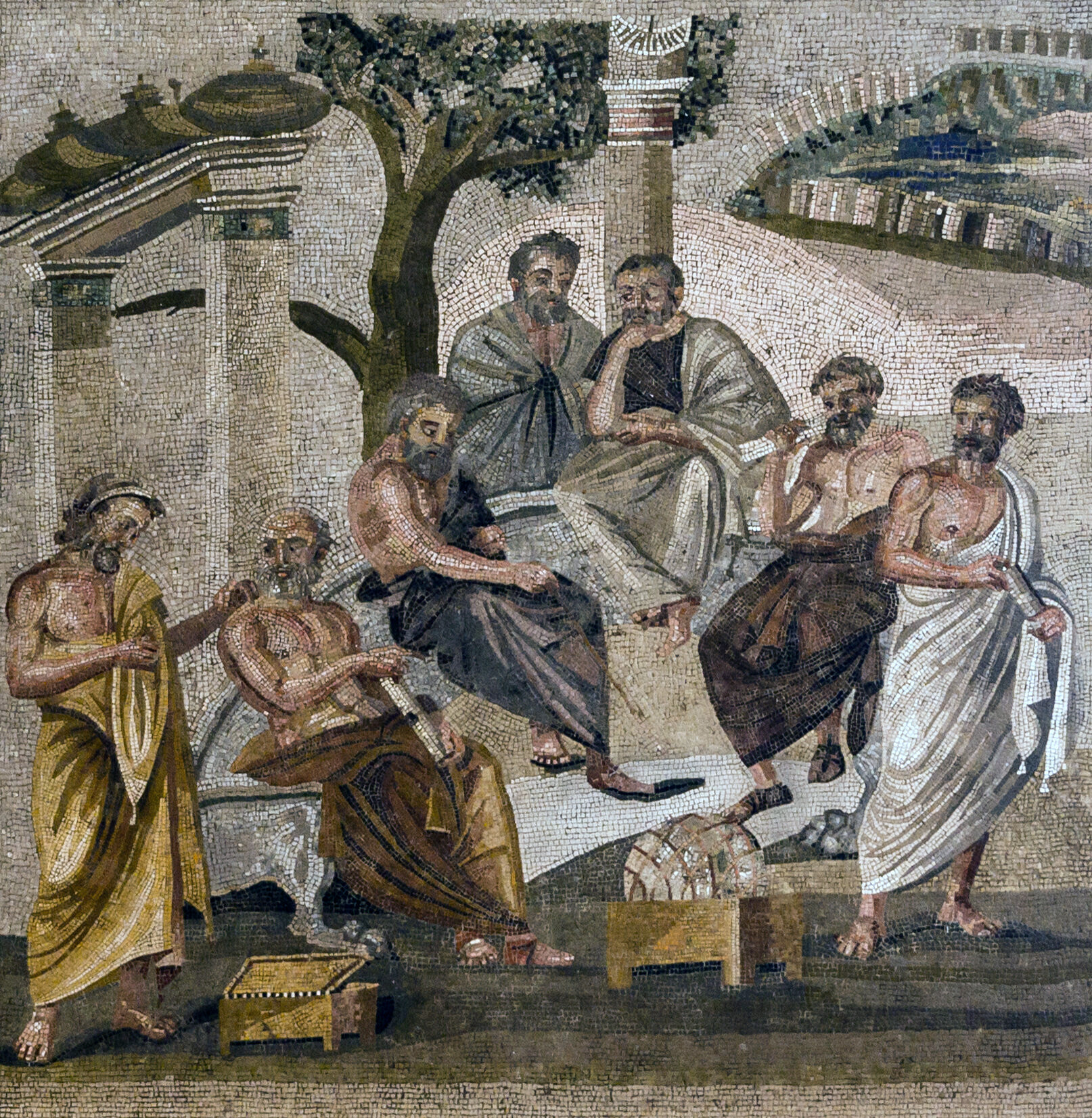
Plato's academy, mosaic from Pompeii.

Though the Academic club was exclusive and not open to the public, it did not, during at least Plato's time, charge fees for membership. Therefore, there was probably not at that time a "school" in the sense of a clear distinction between teachers and students, or even a formal curriculum. There was, however, a distinction between senior and junior members. Two women are known to have studied with Plato at the academy, Axiothea of Phlius and Lasthenia of Mantinea.

As far as is known, during Plato's time, the school did not have any particular doctrine to teach; rather, Plato (and probably other associates of his) posed problems to be studied and solved by the others. There is evidence of lectures given, most notably Plato's lecture "On the Good"; but probably the use of dialectic was more common. According to an unverifiable story, dating some 700 years after the founding of the school, above the entrance to the academy was inscribed the phrase “Let no one untrained in geometry enter.” (Ἀγεωμέτρητος μηδεὶς εἰσίτω.)

Many have imagined that the Academic curriculum would have closely resembled the one canvassed in Plato's Republic. Others, however, have argued that such a picture ignores the obvious peculiar arrangements of the ideal society envisioned in that dialogue. The subjects of study almost certainly included mathematics as well as the philosophical topics with which the Platonic dialogues deal, but there is little reliable evidence. There is some evidence for what today would be considered strictly scientific research: Simplicius reports that Plato had instructed the other members to discover the simplest explanation of the observable, irregular motion of heavenly bodies: “by hypothesizing what uniform and ordered motions is it possible to save the appearances relating to planetary motions” (according to Simplicius, Plato's colleague Eudoxus was the first to have worked on this problem).

Plato's Academy is often said to have been a school for would-be politicians in the ancient world, and to have had many illustrious alumni. In a recent survey of the evidence, Malcolm Schofield, however, has argued that it is difficult to know to what extent the academy was interested in practical (i.e., non-theoretical) politics since much of our evidence "reflects ancient polemic for or against Plato."

== Later history ==
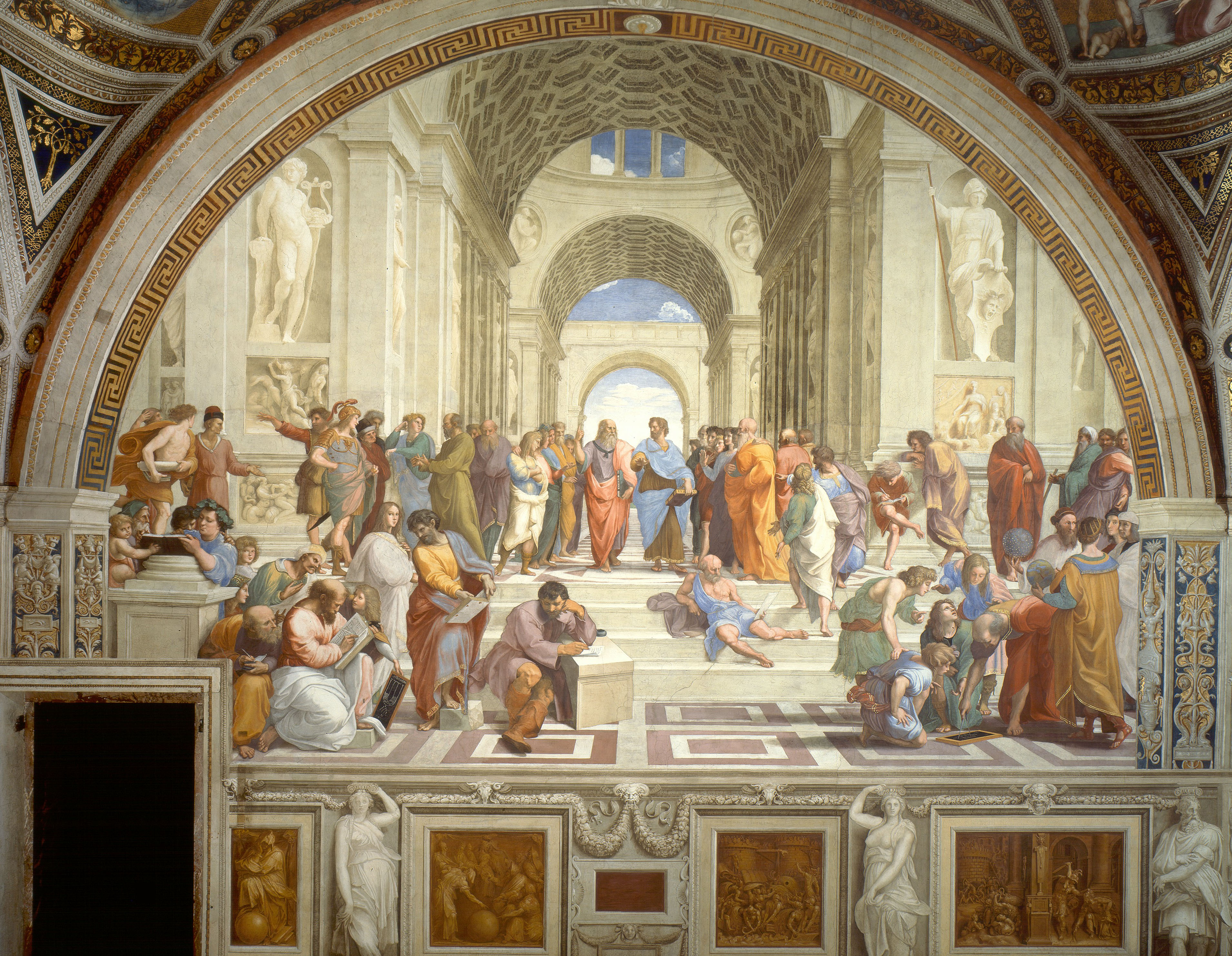
The School of Athens by Raphael (1509–1510), fresco at the Apostolic Palace, Vatican City.

Diogenes Laërtius divided the history of the academy into three: the Old, the Middle, and the New. At the head of the Old he put Plato, at the head of the Middle Academy, Arcesilaus, and of the New, Lacydes. Sextus Empiricus enumerated five divisions of the followers of Plato. He made Plato founder of the first Academy; Arcesilaus of the second; Carneades of the third; Philo and Charmadas of the fourth; Antiochus of the fifth. Cicero recognised only two Academies, the Old and New, and made the latter commence with Arcesilaus.

=== Old Academy ===
Plato's immediate successors as "scholarch" of the academy were Speusippus (347–339 BC), Xenocrates (339–314 BC), Polemo (314–269 BC), and Crates (c. 269–266 BC). Other notable members of the academy include Aristotle, Heraclides, Eudoxus, Philip of Opus, and Crantor.

=== Middle Academy ===
Around 266 BC Arcesilaus became scholarch. Under Arcesilaus (c. 266–241 BC), the academy strongly emphasized Academic skepticism. Arcesilaus was followed by Lacydes of Cyrene (241–215 BC), Evander and Telecles (jointly) (205 – c. 165 BC), and Hegesinus (c. 160 BC).

=== New Academy ===
The New or Third Academy begins with Carneades, in 155 BC, the fourth scholarch in succession from Arcesilaus. It was still largely skeptical, denying the possibility of knowing an absolute truth. Carneades was followed by Clitomachus (129 – c. 110 BC) and Philo of Larissa ("the last undisputed head of the Academy," c. 110–84 BC). According to Jonathan Barnes, "It seems likely that Philo was the last Platonist geographically connected to the Academy."

Around 90 BC, Philo's student Antiochus of Ascalon began teaching his own rival version of Platonism rejecting Skepticism and advocating Stoicism, which began a new phase known as Middle Platonism.

== Destruction ==
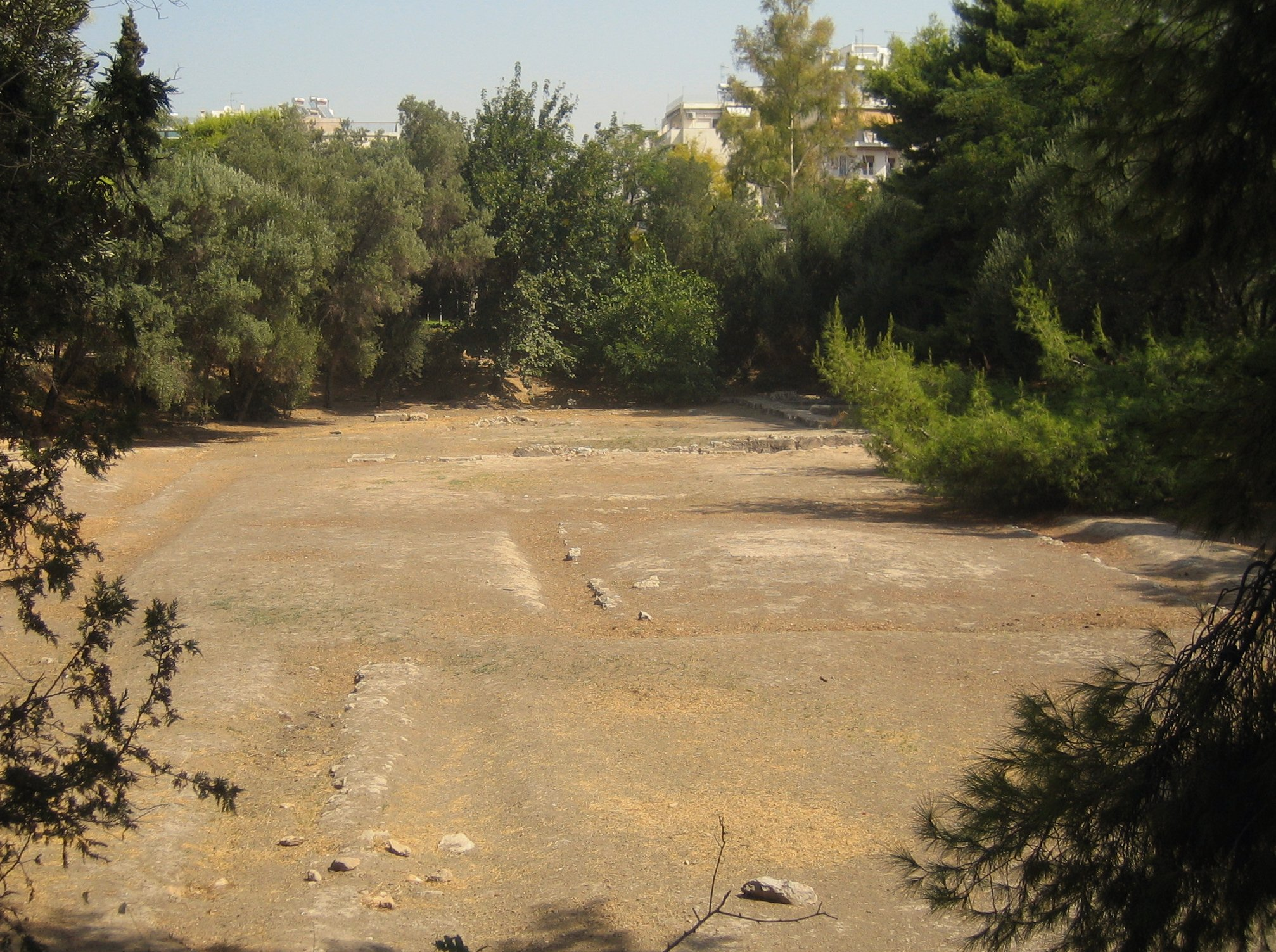
The archaeological site of Plato's academy.

When the First Mithridatic War began in 88 BC, Philo of Larissa left Athens, and took refuge in Rome, where he seems to have remained until his death. In 86 BC, Lucius Cornelius Sulla laid siege to Athens, and conquered the city, causing much destruction. It was during the siege that he laid waste to the academy, for "he laid hands upon the sacred groves, and ravaged the Academy, which was the most wooded of the city's suburbs, as well as the Lyceum."

The destruction of the academy seems to have been so severe as to make the reconstruction and re-opening of the academy impossible. When Antiochus returned to Athens from Alexandria, c. 84 BC, he resumed his teaching but not in the academy. Cicero, who studied under him in 79/8 BC, refers to Antiochus teaching in a gymnasium called Ptolemy. Cicero describes a visit to the site of the academy one afternoon, which was "quiet and deserted at that hour of the day"

== Neoplatonic Academy ==
Philosophers continued to teach Platonism in Athens during the Roman era, but it was not until the early 5th century (c. 410) that a revived Academy was established by some leading Neoplatonists. The origins of Neoplatonist teaching in Athens are uncertain, but when Proclus arrived in Athens in the early 430s, he found Plutarch of Athens and his colleague Syrianus teaching in an academy there. The Neoplatonists in Athens called themselves "successors" (diadochoi, but of Plato) and presented themselves as an uninterrupted tradition reaching back to Plato, but there cannot have actually been any geographical, institutional, economic or personal continuity with the original Academy. The school seems to have been a private foundation, conducted in a large house which Proclus eventually inherited from Plutarch and Syrianus. The heads of the Neoplatonic Academy were Plutarch of Athens, Syrianus, Proclus, Marinus, Isidore, and finally Damascius. The Neoplatonic Academy reached its apex under Proclus (died 485).

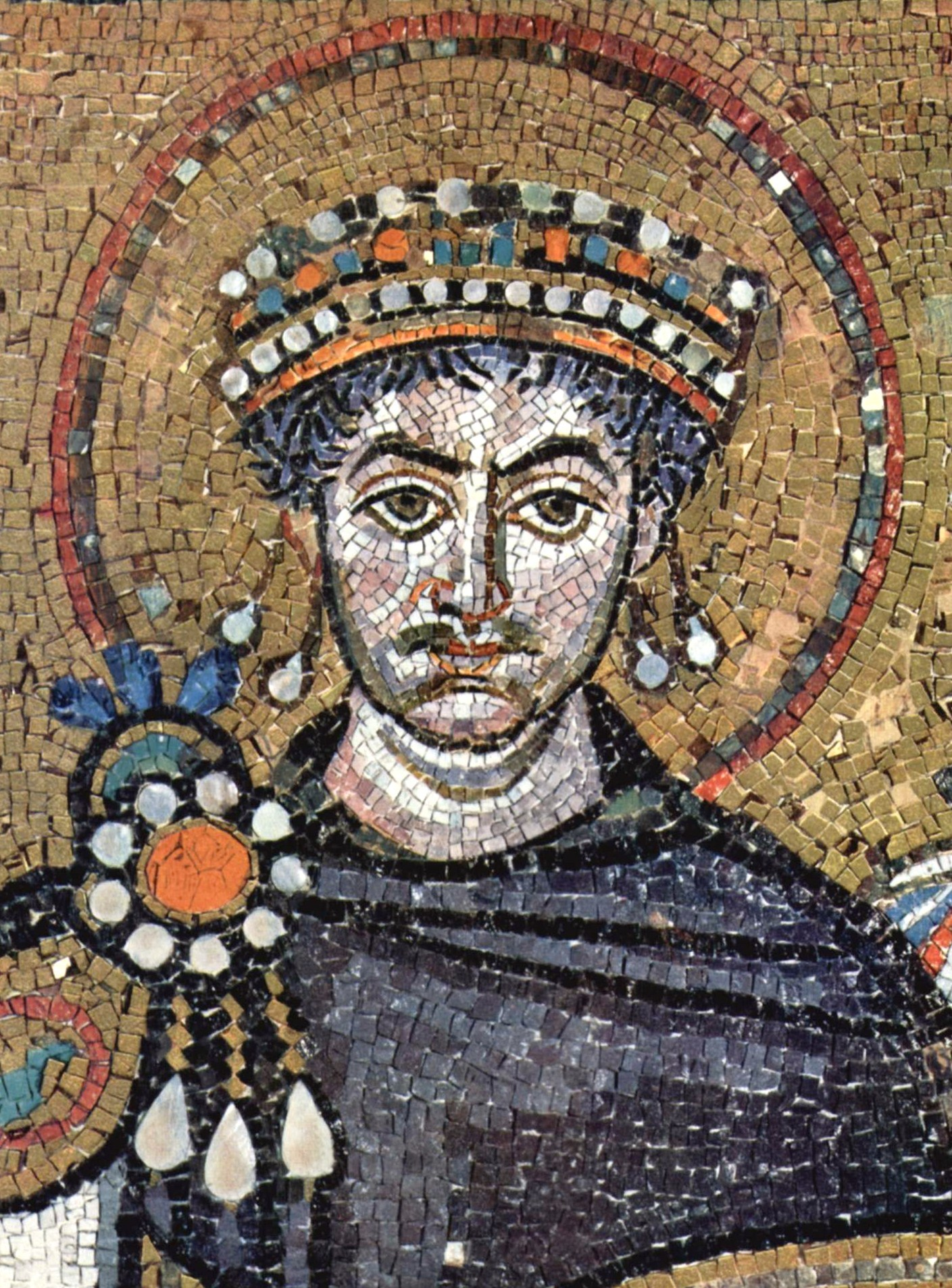
Emperor Justinian I. In 529 A.D. the academy was placed under state control by order of Justinian, effectively strangling this training-school for Hellenism.

The last Greek philosophers of the revived Academy in the 6th century were drawn from various parts of the Hellenistic cultural world and suggest the broad syncretism of the common culture (see koine): Five of the seven Academy philosophers mentioned by Agathias were Syriac in their cultural origin: Hermias and Diogenes (both from Phoenicia), Isidorus of Gaza, Damascius of Syria, Iamblichus of Coele-Syria and perhaps even Simplicius of Cilicia. The emperor Justinian closed the school in 529 A.D.. The last Scholarch of the academy was Damascius (d. 540). According to the sole witness, the historian Agathias, its remaining members looked for protection under the rule of Sassanid king Khosrau I in his capital at Ctesiphon, carrying with them precious scrolls of literature and philosophy, and to a lesser degree of science. After a peace treaty between the Persian and the Byzantine empire in 532, their personal security (an early document in the history of freedom of religion) was guaranteed.

It has been speculated that the academy did not altogether disappear. After his exile, Simplicius (and perhaps some others), may have travelled to Harran, near Edessa. From there, the students of an academy-in-exile could have survived into the 9th century, long enough to facilitate the Arabic revival of the Neoplatonist commentary tradition in Baghdad.

One of the earliest academies established in the East was the 7th-century Academy of Gundishapur in Sassanid Persia.

== See also ==
- Academy of Athens (modern)
- Hellenistic philosophy
- Platonism
- Peripatetic school
- Stoicism
- Epicureanism
- Neoplatonism
