= Crates of Athens =

3rd-century BC Greek Platonist philosopher

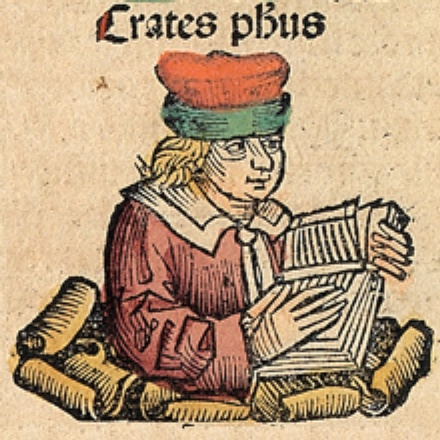
- Crates of Athens, depicted as a medieval scholar in the Nuremberg Chronicle

Crates of Athens (Greek: Κράτης ὁ Ἀθηναῖος; died 268–264 BC) was a Platonist philosopher and the last scholarch of the Old Academy.

== Biography ==
Crates was the son of Antigenes of the Thriasian deme, the pupil and eromenos of Polemo, and his successor as scholarch of the Platonic Academy, in 270–69 BC. The intimate friendship of Crates and Polemo was celebrated in antiquity, and Diogenes Laërtius has preserved an epigram of the poet Antagoras, according to which the two friends were united after death in one tomb. The epigram, according to him, reads:

"Stranger, who passest by, relate that here
The God-like Crates lies, and Polemo;
Two men of kindred nobleness of mind;
Out of whose holy mouths pure wisdom flowed,
And they with upright lives did well display,
The strength of all their principles and teaching."

The most distinguished of the pupils of Crates were the philosopher Arcesilaus, who succeeded him as scholarch, Theodorus the Atheist, and Bion of Borysthenes. The writings of Crates are lost. Diogenes Laërtius says that they were on philosophical subjects, on comedy, and also orations; but the latter were probably written by Crates of Tralles.
