= Tommaso Inghirami =

Italian humanist

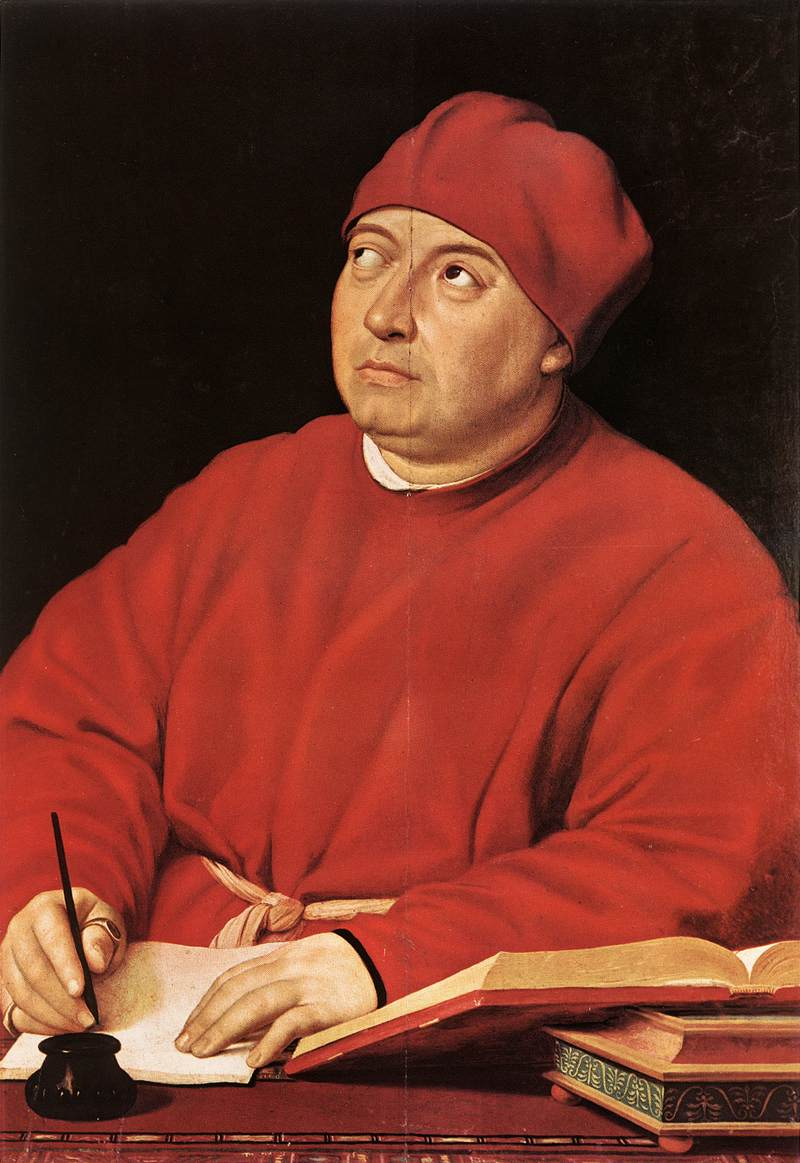
- Portrait of Tommaso Inghirami (ca. 1509) by Raphael (1483–1520)
- Born: 1470; Volterra
- Died: 5 or 6 September 1516 (aged 45-46)
- Other names: Phaedra, Phaedrus, Fedra
- Occupations: Deacon of the Papal Chapel, Prefect of the Palatine Library,

Tommaso Inghirami (1470 – 5/6 September 1516), also known as Phaedra, Phaedrus, or Fedra, was a Renaissance humanist and orator. He was prefect of the Vatican Library for several years and secretary of the Fifth Lateran Council.

== Biography ==
Tommaso Inghirami was born in Volterra in 1470, the son of Paolo Inghirami and of his wife Lucrezia Barlettani. His father, a prominent man in Volterra, was killed in a political uprising in 1472. After the murder, Paolo's children were taken to Florence and raised under the protection of Lorenzo de' Medici, who soon recognized his scholarly potential and in 1483 sent him to Rome under the protection of two of his uncles, both well-placed clerics.

In 1486, Inghirami played Phaedra in the first performance of Seneca's Phaedra since ancient times, staged by Giovanni Sulpizio da Veroli and Raffaele Riario, with support from the Roman Academy of Julius Pomponius Laetus. After this performance, he was known by the nickname "Phaedra" for the rest of his life, though he preferred the masculine form "Phaedrus". (Note: The ex voto he commissioned carries an inscription identifying him as "T. Phaedrus".)

A member of the Roman intellectual elite, Inghirami was praised for his Latin oratory by Ludovico Ariosto, Pietro Bembo, Baldassare Castiglione, Paolo Giovio, Niccolò Machiavelli, and Angelo Colocci.

Inghirami was ordained as a deacon of the Papal Chapel in April 1493. In 1495, he was invited to deliver the address – he titled it Panegyricus in memoriam divi Thomae Aquinatis – for the annual celebration of the feast day of St. Thomas Aquinas held by the Dominican Studium generale, the future Pontifical University of St. Thomas Aquinas (Angelicum) at the Basilica of Santa Maria sopra Minerva in Rome.

In 1496, Inghirami was sent as part of a delegation from Pope Alexander VI to Maximilian I, Holy Roman Emperor, whom he met in Innsbruck on 14 March 1497. The emperor was so impressed by an oration Inghirami gave that he named him poet laureate and count palatine. On 16 January of the following year, he gave a much-noted eulogy in the presence of the entire papal court at a Memorial Mass for the young John, Prince of Asturias, son of King Ferdinand and Queen Isabel of Spain, held at the Church of San Giacomo degli Spagnuoli. In 1505, he eulogized his teacher, Pietro Menzi da Vicenza, with an oration that denounced the corruption of the papal court, praising by contrast both the deceased and the newly elected Pope Julius II. This and other eulogies he delivered were published shortly after he delivered them. (Note: McManamon lists four published between 1504 and 1513.)

In 1508, Inghirami suffered injuries when the mule he was riding collided with an oxcart loaded with grain. The event was recorded in an ex voto, a devotional offering he commissioned to express his gratitude for surviving the accident. Attributed to Raphael, it is a small oil painting on a panel; it depicts the accident, with Inghirami trapped under the cart's wheels. It originally hung in the Lateran Cathedral. And art historians credit Inghirami with authorship of the program for Raphael’s frescoes that decorate the Stanza della Segnatura, which establishes a relationship between ancient Roman and Renaissance culture, between the rule of the Roman Emperor Augustus and his modern counterpart, Pope Julius II.

Inghirami met Desiderius Erasmus in 1509 and they became lifelong friends and correspondents. Erasmus noted Inghirami was more famous as an orator than writer. In 1528, long after Inghirami's death, Erasmus used Inghirami as an example of the danger of restricting one's use of Latin to that of Cicero, citing Inghirami's 1509 Good Friday sermon in which he eschewed Church Latin and treated Christ as a self-sacrificing hero rather than the Redeemer.

As a humanist scholar engaged in celebrating the ancient world he became head of a new theater company in 1510. Two years later he organized the festivities surrounding the alliance between Pope Julius and the Holy Roman Emperor. The next year he directed a performance of Plautus' Poenulus in Latin.

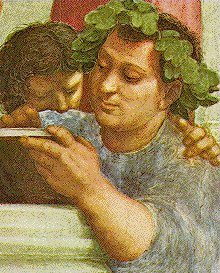
Inghirami as Epicurus in Raphael's School of Athens

In 1510, Inghirami was appointed Prefect of the Palatine Library. As secretary to the College of Cardinals he served as secretary for the papal conclave of 1513 which elected Pope Leo X. About this time he commissioned Raphael to paint his portrait. He appears in the robes of a canon of St. Peter's Basilica. Raphael had already, in 1509, used Inghirami as the model for the Greek philosopher Epicurus in his fresco The School of Athens for the papal apartments. (Note: Raphael may also have included him as the chubby figure in a red hat in his tapestry of St. Paul preaching in Athens.)

He served as secretary of the Fifth Lateran Council under Pope Julius II and, after his death, under Pope Leo X.

Inghirami was overweight at least in his final decades, as shown in Raphael's works. He suffered from strabismus, the failure of the eyes to align, a condition that Raphael disguised in his portrait by focusing his gaze away from the viewer at some unseen superior or inspiration. Contemporary letters hint he was homosexual or state it as fact, an interpretation supported by Raphael's "School of Athens" where Inghirami is embraced from behind by a half-hidden male figure, and his unusual feminine nickname of Phaedra.

Inghirami died on either 5 or 6 September 1516.

== See also ==
- Portrait of Tommaso Inghirami
