= The School of Athens =

Fresco by Raphael

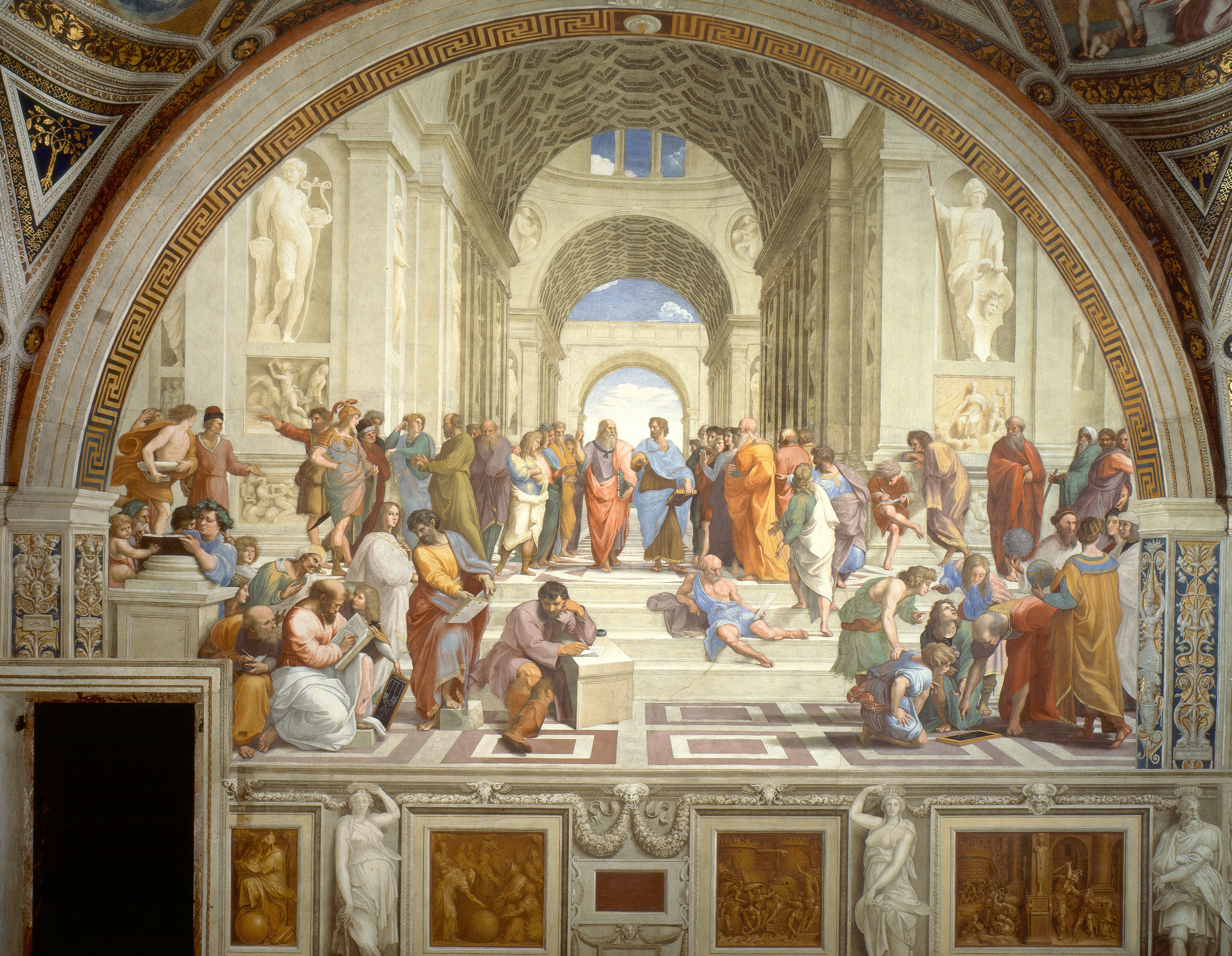
- Artist: Raphael
- Year: 1509–1511
- Type: Fresco
- Dimensions: 500 cm × 770 cm (200 in × 300 in)
- Location: Apostolic Palace, Vatican Museums, Vatican City

The School of Athens (Italian: Scuola di Atene) is a fresco by the Italian Renaissance artist Raphael. It was painted between 1509 and 1511 as part of a commission by Pope Julius II to decorate the rooms now called the Stanze di Raffaello in the Apostolic Palace in Vatican City.

The fresco depicts a congregation of ancient mathematicians, philosophers, and scientists, with Plato and Aristotle featured in the center. The identities of most figures are ambiguous or discernible only through subtle details or allusions; among those commonly identified are Socrates, Pythagoras, Archimedes, Heraclitus, Ibn Rushd (known as Averroes in the west), Euclid, and Zarathustra. Additionally, Italian artists Leonardo da Vinci and Michelangelo are believed to be portrayed through Plato and Heraclitus, respectively. Raphael included a self-portrait beside Ptolemy.

The identity of the figure in the white robe on the left side of the fresco remains unknown. Notably, the figure is the only one to gaze directly at the viewer. The figure is most commonly identified as either Hypatia or Francesco Maria I della Rovere, the nephew of Pope Julius II.

The painting is notable for its use of accurate perspective projection, a defining characteristic of Renaissance art, which Raphael learned from Leonardo; likewise, the themes of the painting, such as the rebirth of Ancient Greek philosophy and culture in Europe were inspired by Leonardo's individual pursuits in theatre, engineering, optics, geometry, physiology, anatomy, history, architecture and art.

The School of Athens is regarded as one of Raphael's best-known works and has been described as his "masterpiece and the perfect embodiment of the classical spirit of the Renaissance".

== Program, subject, figure identifications and interpretations ==
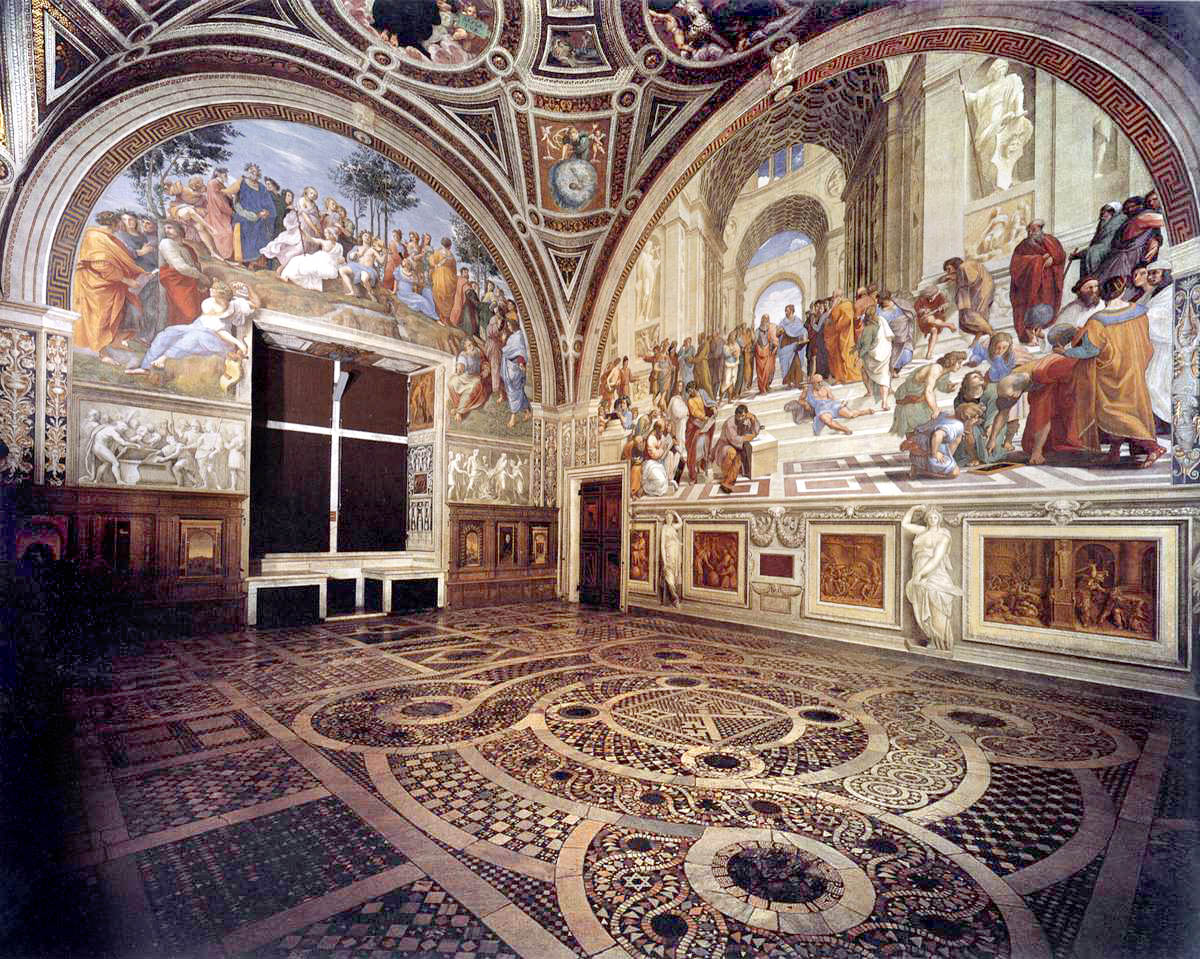
The Stanza della Segnatura

The Stanza della Segnatura was the first of the rooms to be decorated, and The School of Athens, representing philosophy, is believed to be the third painting to be finished there, after La Disputa (Theology) on the opposite wall, and the Parnassus (Literature).

The School of Athens is one of a group of four main frescoes on the walls of the Stanza (those on either side centrally interrupted by windows) that depict distinct branches of knowledge. Each theme is identified above by a separate tondo containing a majestic female figure seated in the clouds, with putti bearing the phrases: "Seek Knowledge of Causes", "Divine Inspiration", "Knowledge of Things Divine" (Disputa), "To Each What Is Due". Accordingly, the figures on the walls below exemplify philosophy, poetry (including music), theology, and justice. The traditional title is not Raphael's. The subject of the painting is actually philosophy, or at least ancient Greek philosophy, and its overhead tondo-label, "Causarum Cognitio", tells us what kind, as it appears to echo Aristotle's emphasis on wisdom as knowing why, hence knowing the causes, in Metaphysics Book I and Physics Book II. Indeed, Plato and Aristotle appear to be the central figures in the scene. However, many of the philosophers depicted sought knowledge of first causes. Many lived before Plato and Aristotle, and hardly a third were Athenians. The architecture contains Roman elements, but the general semi-circular setting having Plato and Aristotle at its centre might be alluding to Pythagoras' monad.

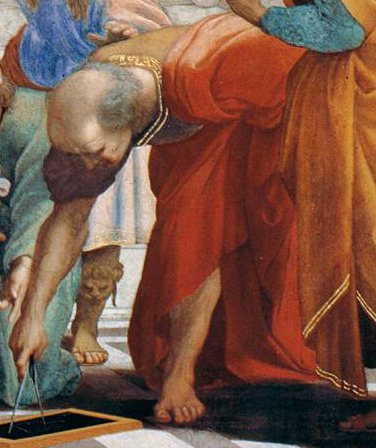
Bramante as Euclid

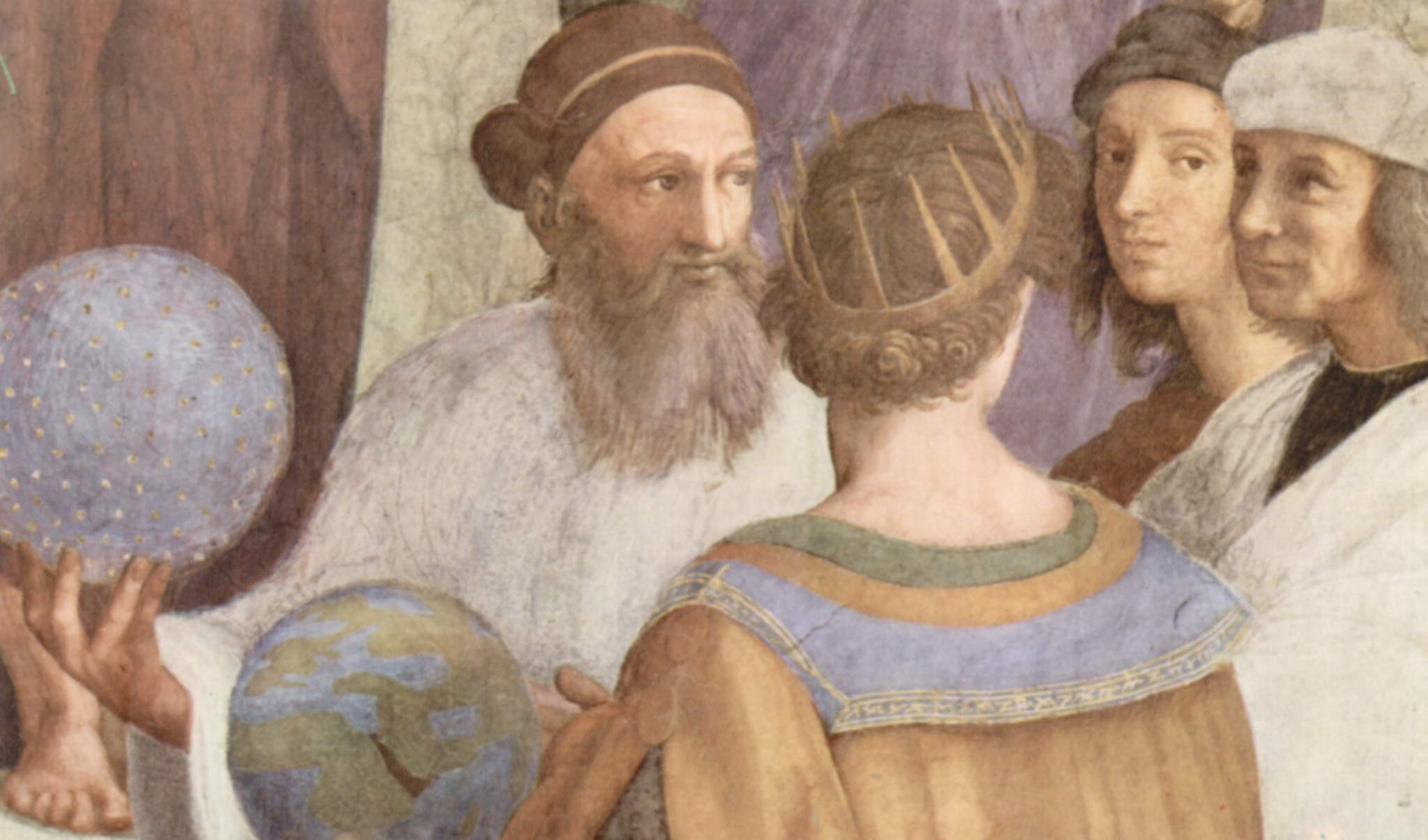
Zoroaster; Ptolemy; Raphael as Apelles; and Perugino, Il Sodoma, or Timoteo Viti as Protogenes

Commentators have suggested that nearly every great ancient Greek philosopher can be found in the painting, but determining which are depicted is speculative, since Raphael made no designations outside possible likenesses, and no contemporary documents explain the painting. Compounding the problem, Raphael had to invent a system of iconography to allude to various figures for whom there were no traditional visual types. For example, while the Socrates figure is immediately recognizable from Classical busts, one of the figures alleged to be Epicurus is far removed from his standard depiction.

Aspects of the fresco other than the identities of the figures have also been variously interpreted, but few such interpretations are unanimously accepted among scholars. That the rhetorical gestures of Plato and Aristotle are kinds of pointing (to the heavens, and down to earth) is popularly accepted as likely. However, Plato's Timaeus – which is the book Raphael places in his hand – was a sophisticated treatment of space, time, and change, including the Earth, which guided mathematical sciences for over a millennium. Aristotle, with his four-elements theory, held that all change on Earth was owing to motions of the heavens. In the painting Aristotle carries his Ethics, which he denied could be reduced to a mathematical science. It is not certain how much the young Raphael knew of ancient philosophy, what guidance he might have had from people such as Bramante and whether a detailed program was dictated by his sponsor, Pope Julius II.

Nevertheless, the fresco has often been interpreted as an exhortation to philosophy and as a visual representation of the role of Love in elevating people toward higher knowledge, in consonance with contemporary theories of Marsilio Ficino and other neo-Platonic thinkers linked to Raphael.

Finally, according to Giorgio Vasari, the scene includes accurate portraits of Raphael himself, the Duke of Mantua, Zoroaster and some Evangelists.

However, to Heinrich Wölfflin, "it is quite wrong to attempt interpretations of the School of Athens as an esoteric treatise ... The all-important thing was the artistic motive which expressed a physical or spiritual state, and the name of the person was a matter of indifference" in Raphael's time. Raphael's artistry then orchestrates a beautiful space, continuous with that of viewers in the Stanza, in which a great variety of human figures, each one expressing "mental states by physical actions", interact, in a "polyphony" unlike anything in earlier art, in the ongoing dialogue of Philosophy.

An interpretation of the fresco relating to hidden symmetries of the figures and the star constructed by Bramante was given by Guerino Mazzola and collaborators. The main basis are two mirrored triangles on the drawing from Bramante (Euclid), which correspond to the feet positions of certain figures.

Paolo Zamboni, professor of vascular surgery at the University of Ferrara, made a medical study of the painting, noting that Raphael's depiction of Michelangelo (as Heraclitus) shows varicose veins in the legs.

=== Figures ===
The identities of some of the philosophers in the picture, such as Plato and Aristotle, have been ascertained. Several other of Raphael's figures have been the subject of conjecture. Some have received multiple identifications, both as depictions of ancients and as portraits of Raphael's contemporaries. Vasari mentions a portrait of the young Duke of Mantua, leaning over Bramante with his hands raised near the bottom right, and a self-portrait of Raphael himself.

=== Central figures (14 and 15) ===
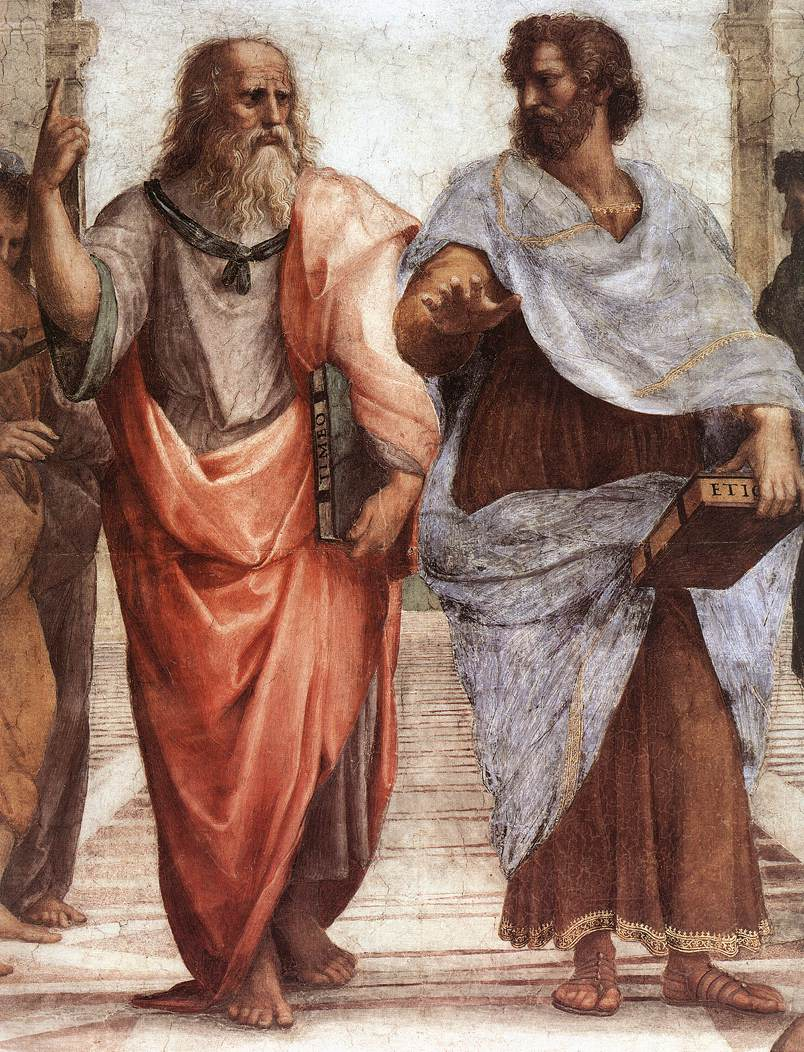
An elder Plato walks alongside a younger Aristotle.

In the center of the fresco, at its architecture's central vanishing point, are the two undisputed main subjects: Plato on the left and his student Aristotle on the right. Both figures hold contemporary (of the time of painting) bound copies of their books in their left hands, while gesturing with their right. Plato holds Timaeus and Aristotle holds his Nicomachean Ethics. Plato is depicted as old, grey, and barefoot. By contrast, Aristotle, slightly ahead of him, is in mature manhood, wearing sandals and gold-trimmed robes, and the youths about them seem to look his way. In addition, these two central figures gesture along different dimensions: Plato vertically, upward along the picture-plane, into the vault above; Aristotle on the horizontal plane at right-angles to the picture-plane (hence in strong foreshortening), initiating a flow of space toward viewers.

It is popularly thought that their gestures indicate central aspects of their philosophies: for Plato, his Theory of Forms, and for Aristotle, an emphasis on concrete particulars. Many interpret the painting to show a divergence of the two philosophical schools of classical Western philosophy. Plato argues a sense of timelessness whilst Aristotle looks into the physicality of life and the visible world.

=== Setting ===
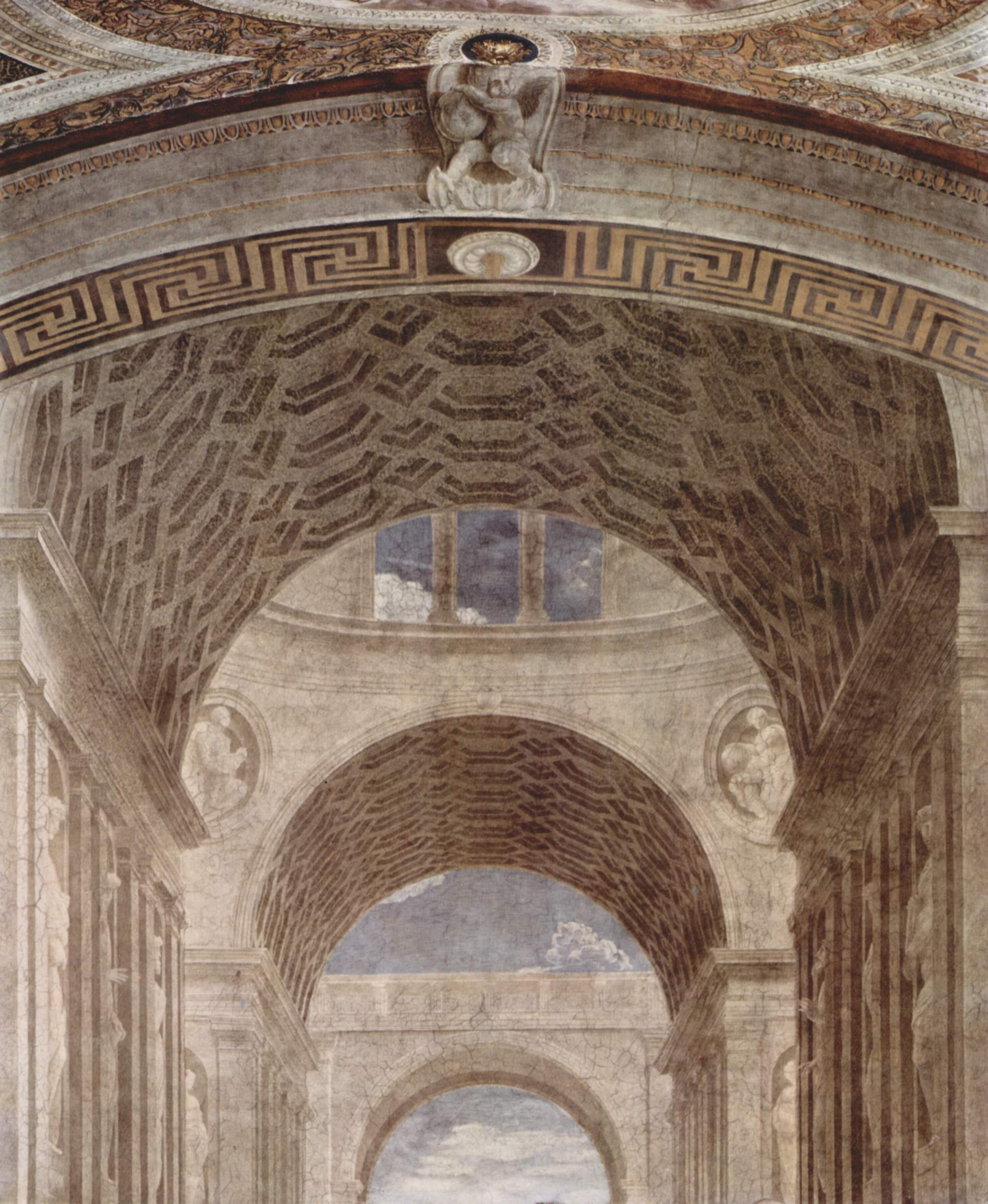
Detail of the architecture

The building is in the shape of a Greek cross, which some have suggested was intended to show a harmony between pagan philosophy and Christian theology (see Christianity and Paganism and Christian philosophy). The architecture of the building was inspired by the work of Bramante, who, according to Vasari, helped Raphael with the architecture in the picture. The resulting architecture was similar to the then new St. Peter's Basilica.

There are two sculptures in the background. The one on the left is the god Apollo, god of light, archery and music, holding a lyre. The sculpture on the right is Athena, goddess of wisdom, in her Roman guise as Minerva.

The main arch, above the characters, shows a meander (also known as a Greek fret or Greek key design), a design using continuous lines that repeat in a "series of rectangular bends" which originated on pottery of the Greek Geometric period and then became widely used in ancient Greek architectural friezes.

== Drawings and cartoon ==
A number of drawings made by Raphael as studies for the School of Athens are extant. A study for the Diogenes is in the Städel in Frankfurt while a study for the group around Pythagoras, in the lower left of the painting, is preserved in the Albertina Museum in Vienna. Several drawings, showing the two men talking while walking up the steps on the right and the Medusa on Athena's shield, (Note: Possibly derived from a figure in Leonardo's Battle of Anghiari.) the statue of Athena (Minerva) and three other statues, a study for the combat scene in the relief below Apollo and "Euclid" teaching his pupils are in the Ashmolean Museum of Art and Archaeology at the University of Oxford.

The cartoon for the painting is in the Pinacoteca Ambrosiana in Milan. Missing from it is the architectural background, the figures of Heraclitus, Raphael, and Protogenes. The group of the philosophers in the left foreground strongly recall figures from Leonardo's Adoration of the Magi. Additionally, there are some engravings of the scene's sculptures by Marcantonio Raimondi; they may have been based on lost drawings by Raphael, as they do not match the fresco exactly.

== Copies ==
The Victoria and Albert Museum in London has a rectangular copy over 4 metres by 8 metres in size, painted on canvas, dated 1755 by Anton Raphael Mengs, on display in the eastern Cast Court.

Modern reproductions of the fresco abound. For example, a full-size one can be seen in the auditorium of Old Cabell Hall at the University of Virginia. Produced in 1902 by George W. Breck to replace an older reproduction that was destroyed in a fire in 1895, it is four inches off scale from the original, because the Vatican would not allow identical reproductions of its art works.

A 1689 tapestry reproduction by the Gobelins Manufactory and commissioned by Louis XIV hangs above the presiding officer's platform in the French National Assembly chamber. It had been removed in 2017 for a three-year restoration process undertaken by the Mobilier National, which manages Gobelins Manufactory.

Other reproductions include: in Königsberg Cathedral, Kaliningrad by Neide, in the University of North Carolina at Asheville's Highsmith University Student Union, and a recent one in the seminar room at Baylor University's Brooks College. A copy of Raphael's School of Athens was painted on the wall of the ceremonial stairwell that leads to the famous, main-floor reading room of the Sainte-Geneviève Library in Paris.

The two figures to the left of Plotinus were used as part of the cover art of both Use Your Illusion I and II albums of Guns N' Roses.

== Precursors ==
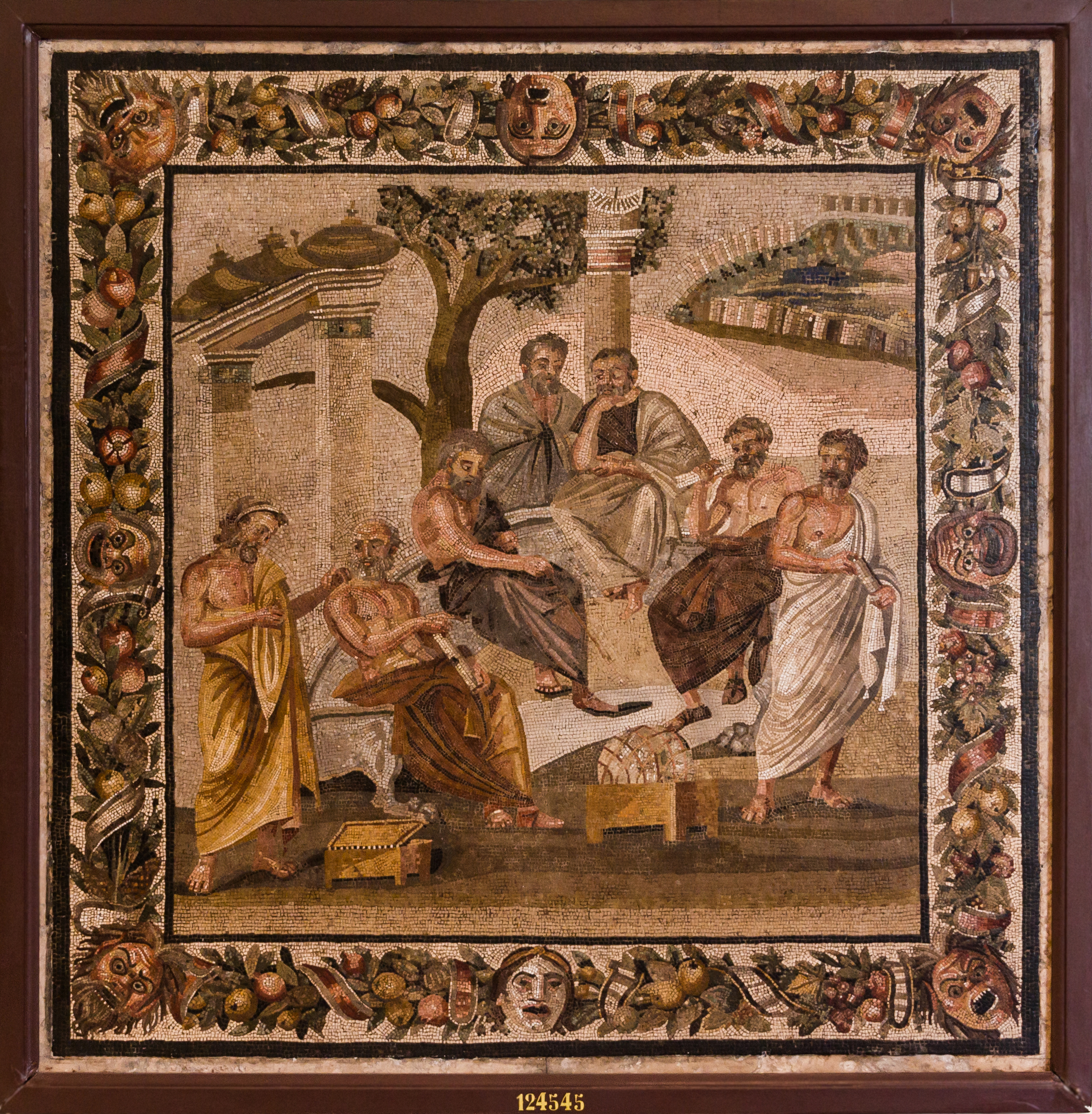
Plato's Academy mosaic from Pompeii

Similar subjects are known from antiquity, notably the Plato's Academy mosaic. It perhaps also appeared in two groups of statues from Roman Egypt. The 19th century French consul Jean-François Mimaut mentioned nine statues at the Serapeum of Alexandria holding rolls, while eleven statues were found at the Memphis Saqqara. A review of "Les Statues Ptolémaïques du Sarapieion de Memphis" ascribed them to the 3rd century, sculpted of limestone and stucco, some standing and others sitting. Rowe and Rees 1956 suggested that both statue groups share a similar subject to the Plato's Academy mosaic, with the Saqqara figures identified as: "(1) Pindar, (2) Demetrius of Phaleron, (3) x (?), (4) Orpheus (?) with birds, (5) Hesiod, (6) Homer, (7) x (?), (8) Protagoras, (9) Thales, (10) Heraclitus, (11) Plato, (12) Aristotle (?)." However, there have been other suggestions (e.g. Mattusch 2008). Plato and Thales are commonly identified as central figures.

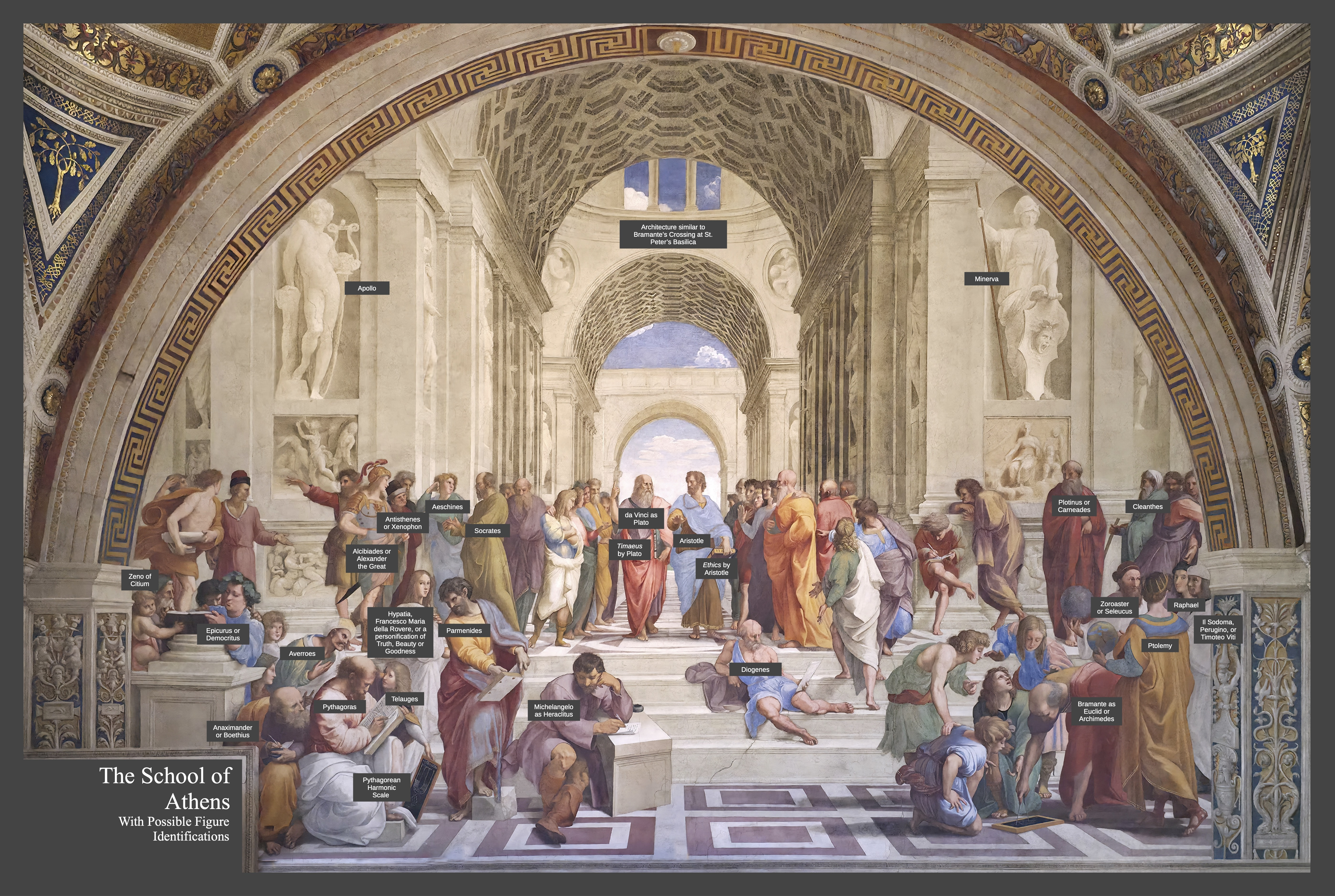
The School of Athens with popular figural identifications

== Gallery ==
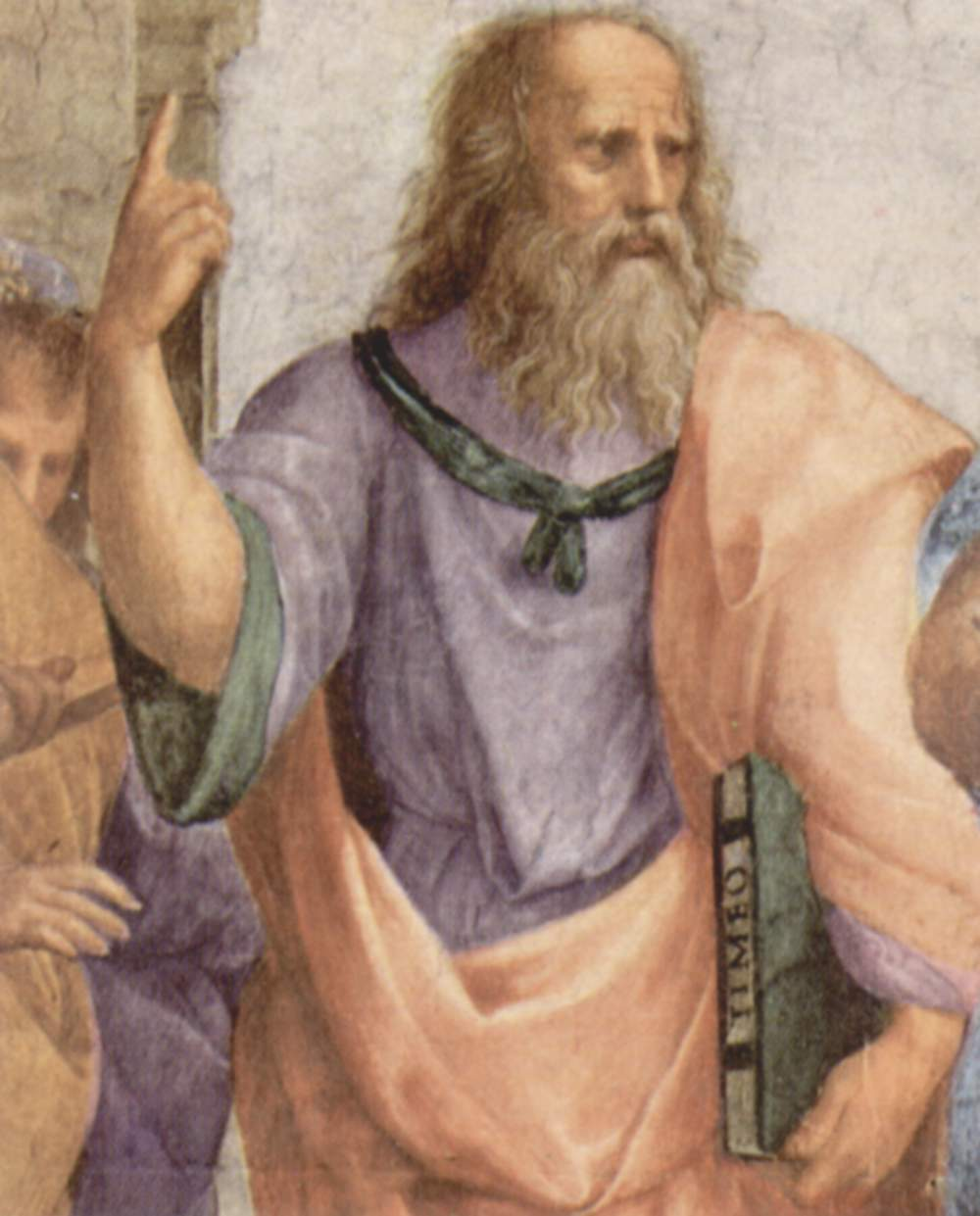
Leonardo da Vinci as Plato

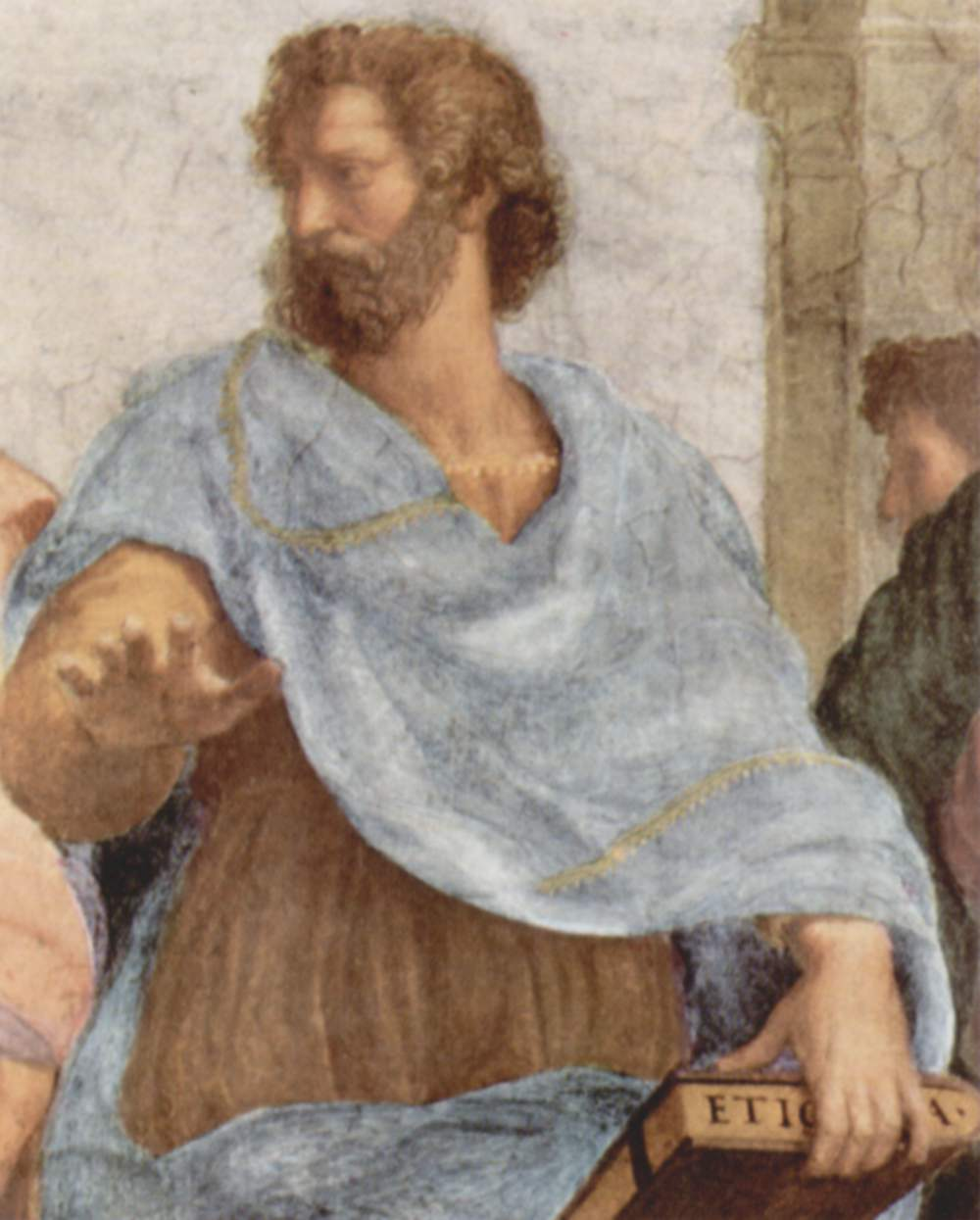
Aristotle

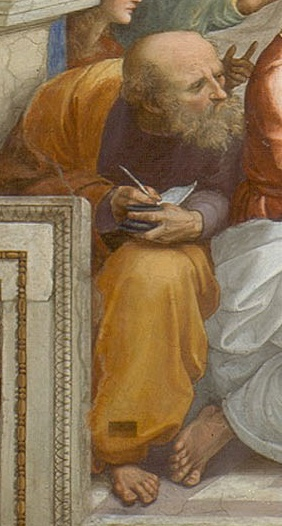
Anaximander

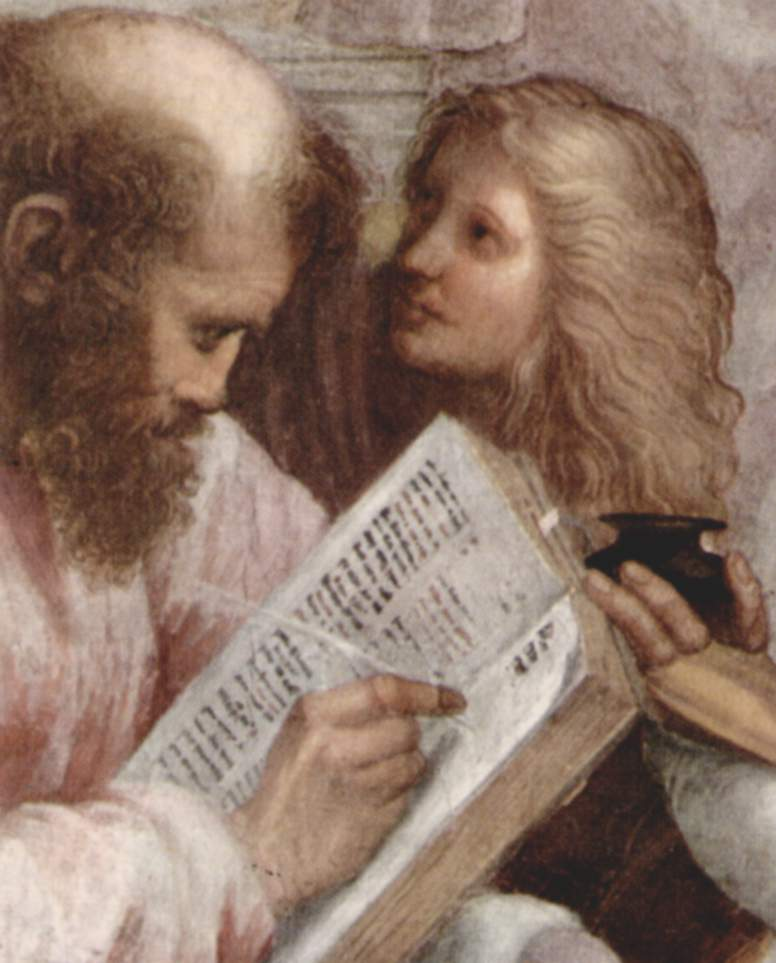
Pythagoras

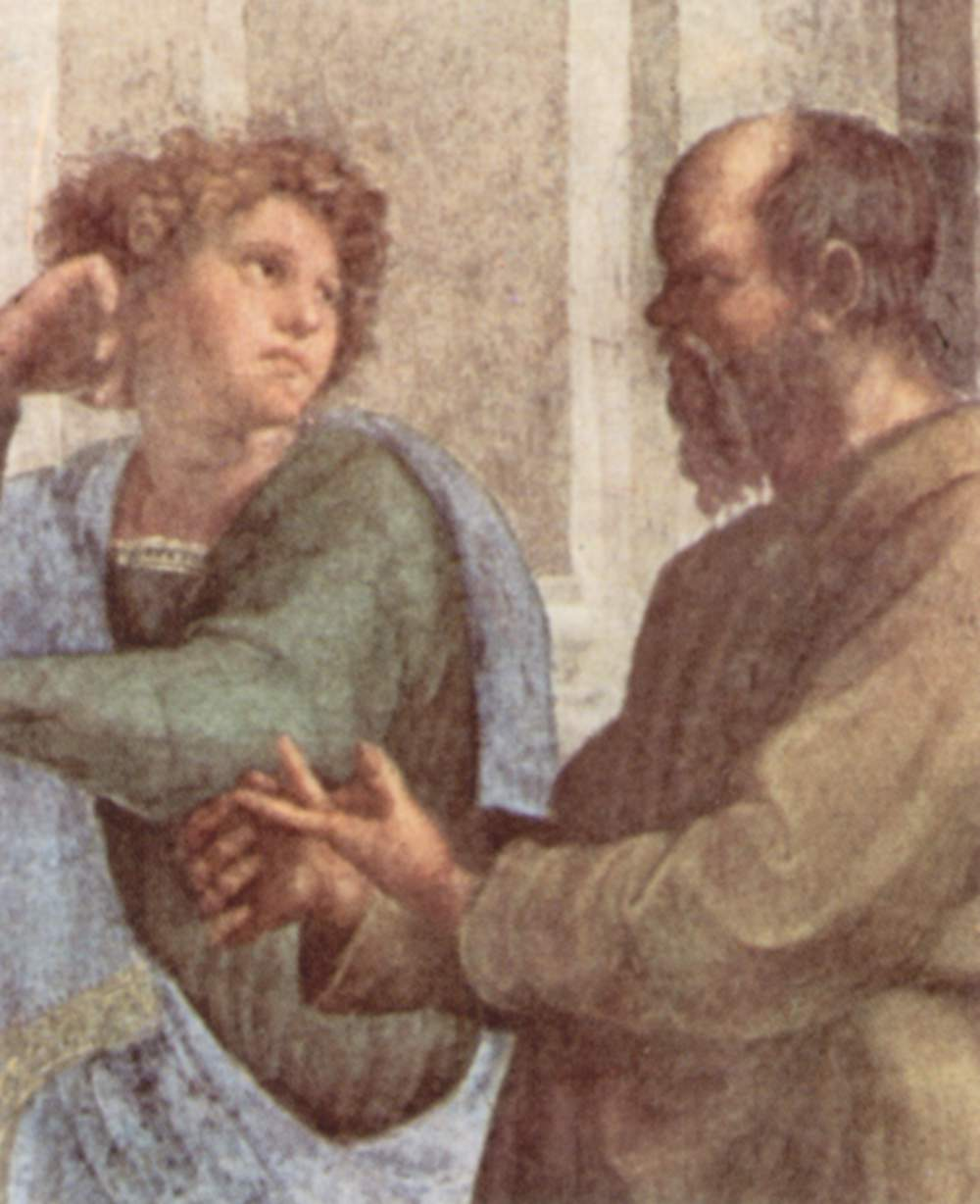
Aeschines and Socrates

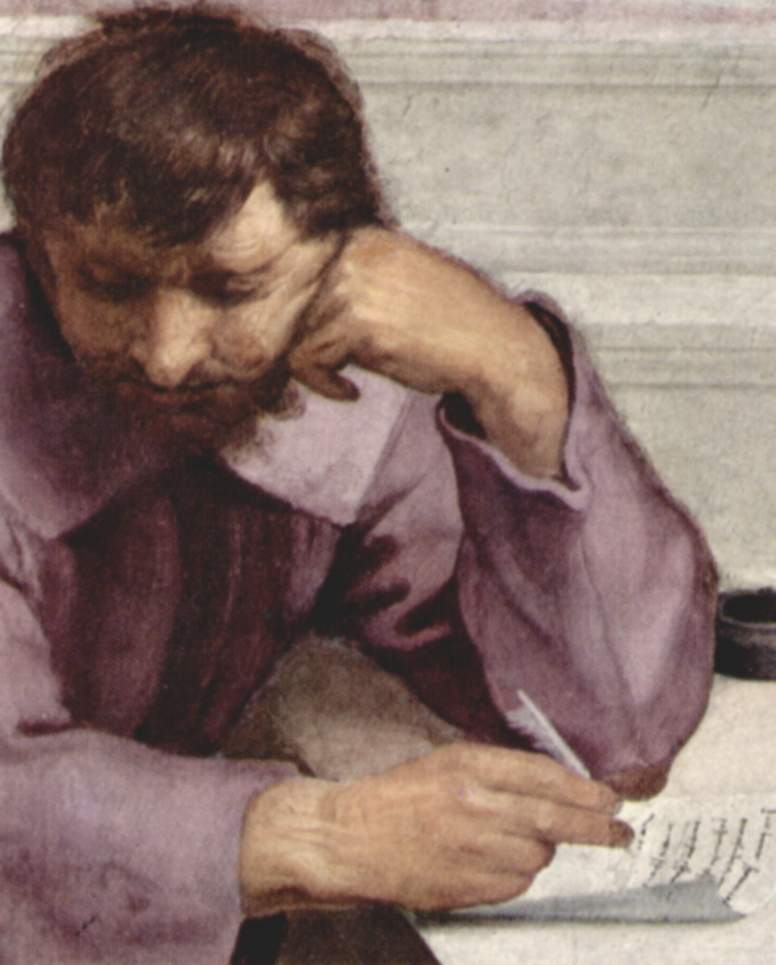
Michelangelo as Heraclitus

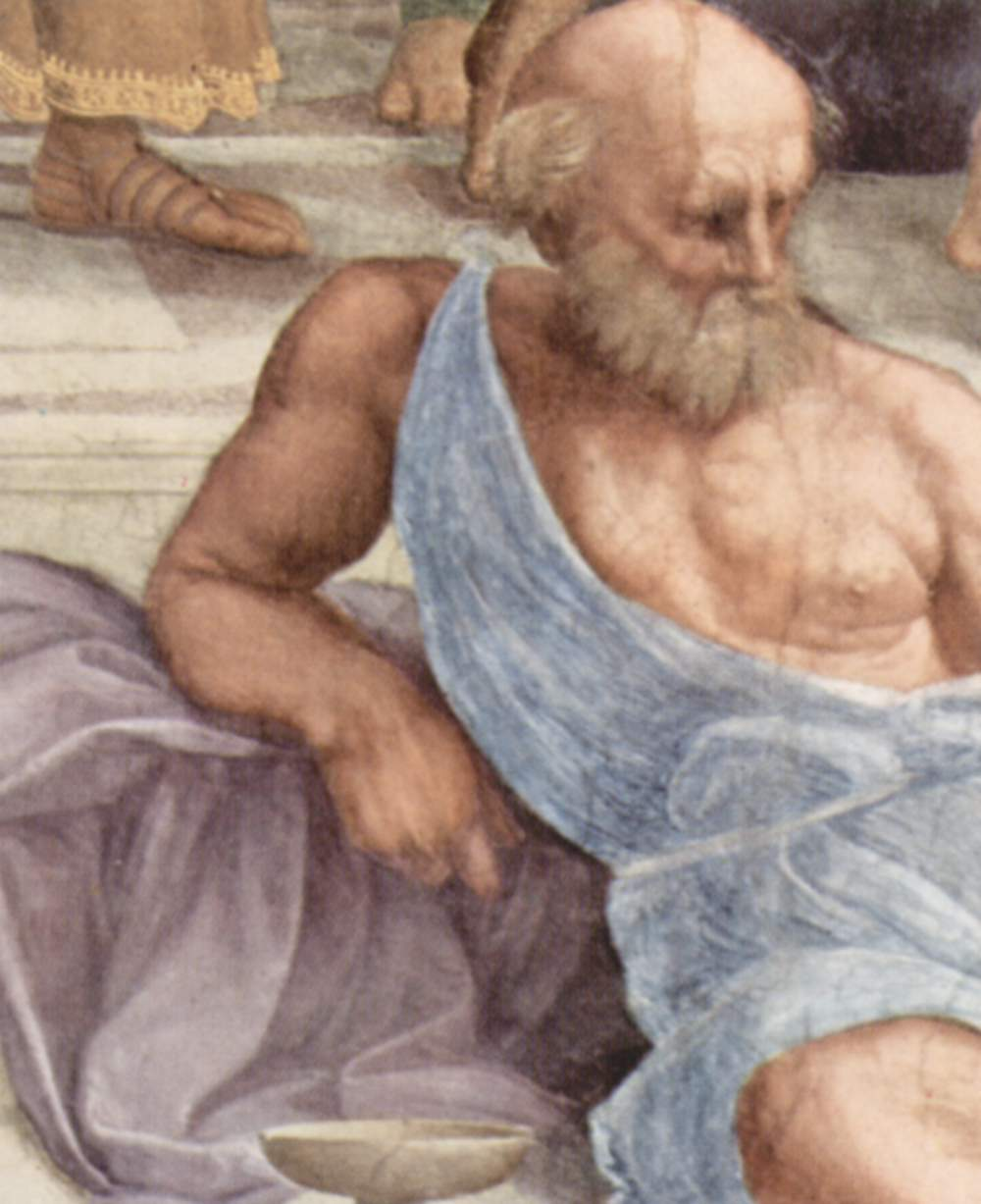
Diogenes

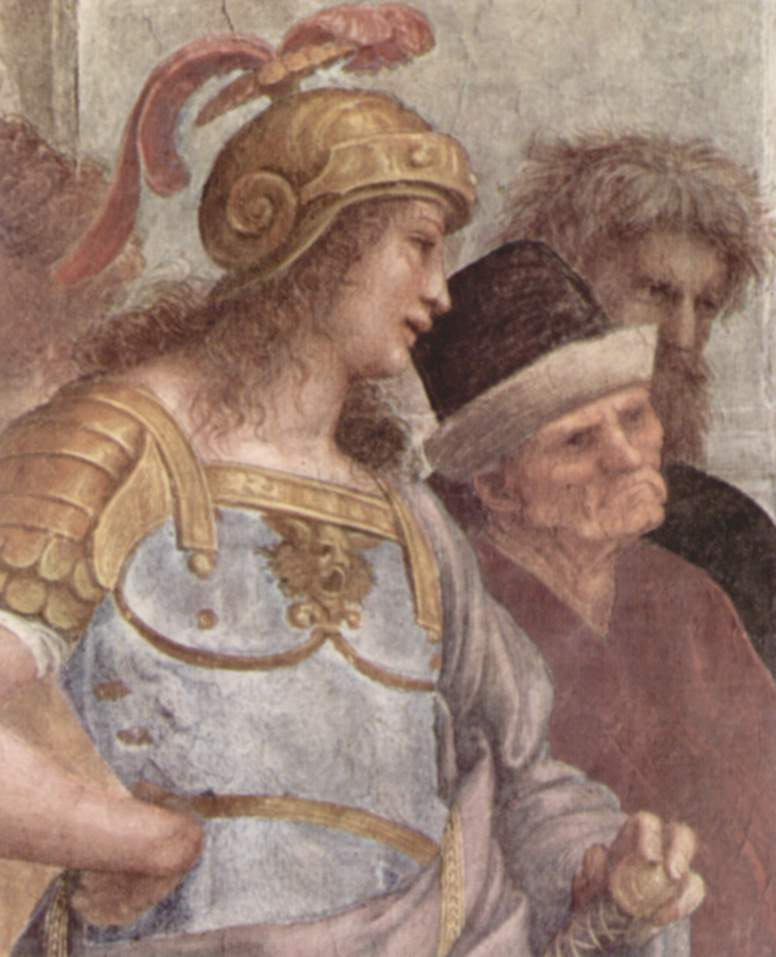
Alcibiades or Alexander the Great and Antisthenes or Xenophon

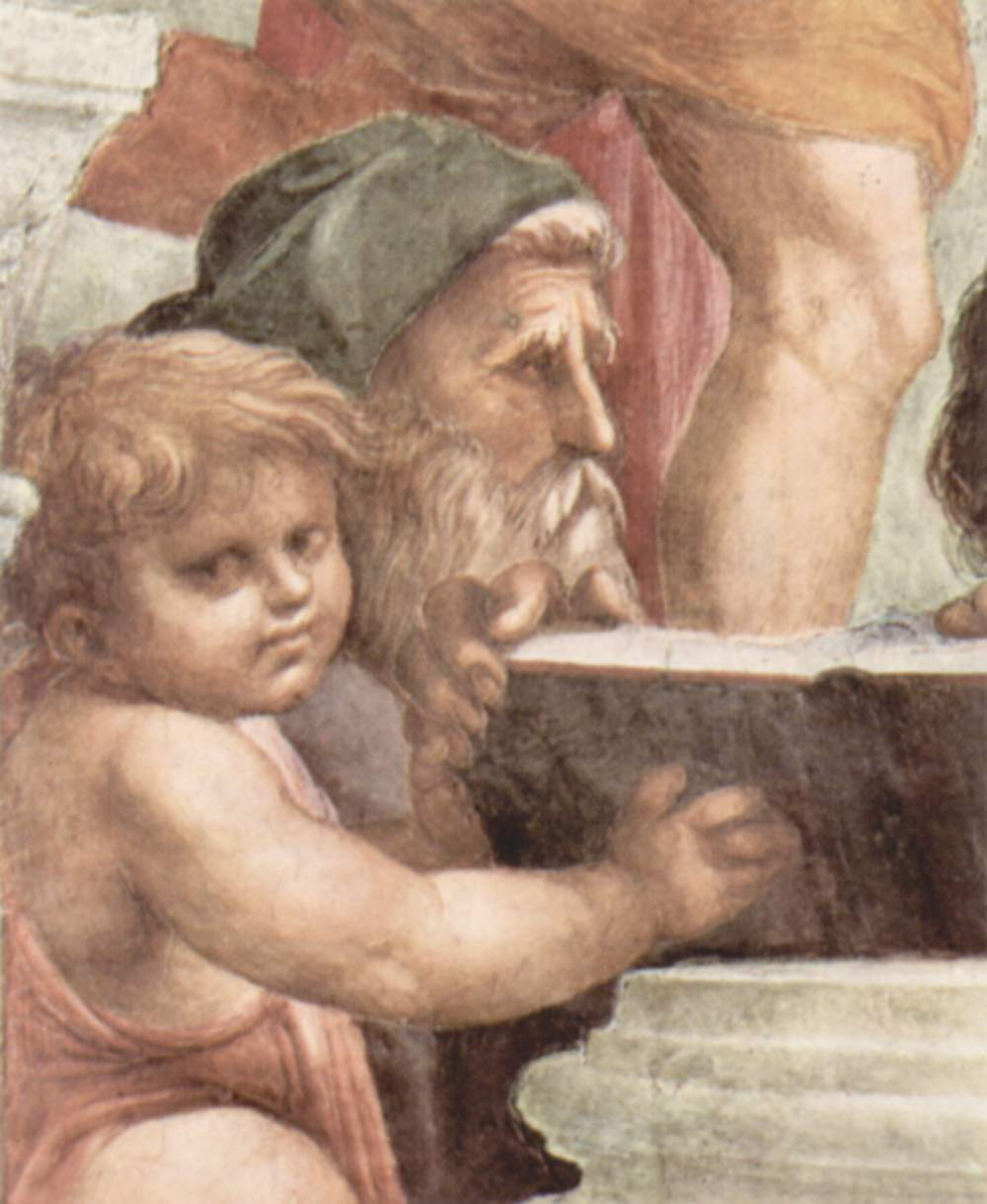
Possibly Zeno of Citium

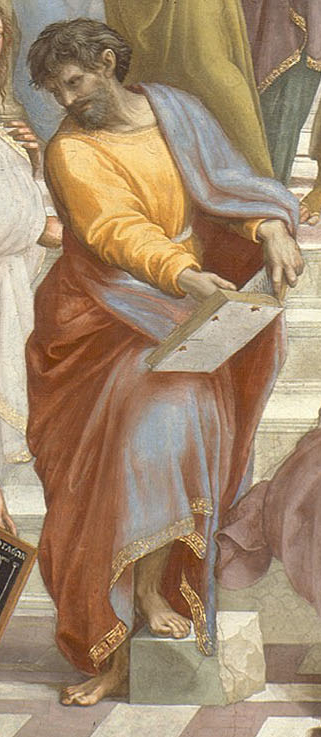
Parmenides

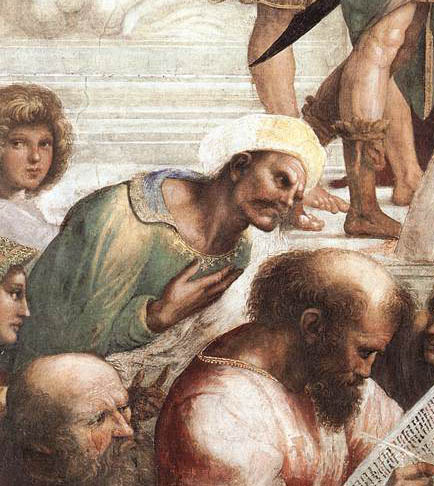
Ibn Rushd (Averroes) and Pythagoras

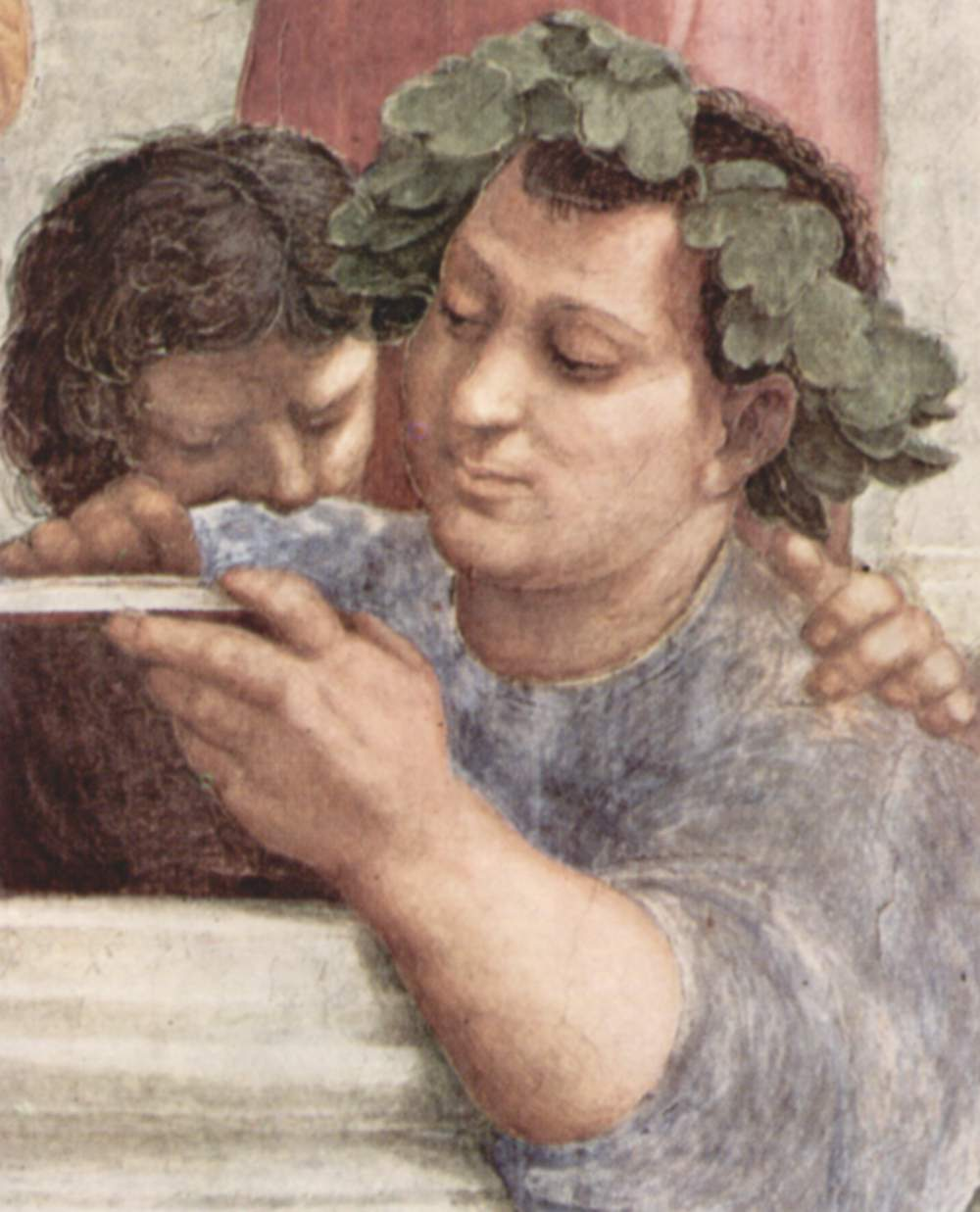
Possibly Epicurus or Democritus

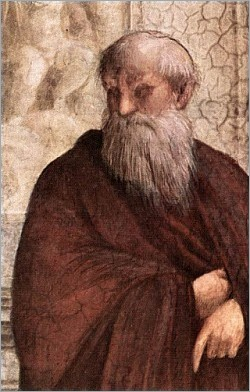
Carneades

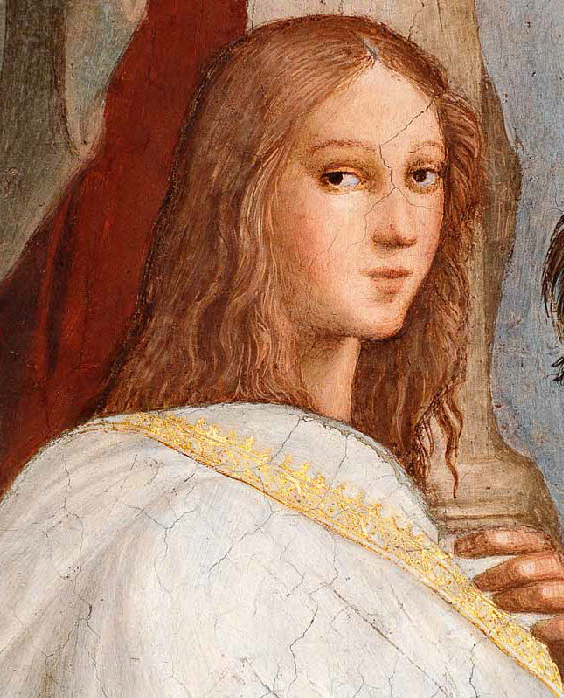
Possibly Francesco Maria I della Rovere or Pico della Mirandola

== See also ==
- List of paintings by Raphael
- Cultural references to Leonardo da Vinci
- The Last Supper by Leonardo da Vinci
