= Jean Yeuwain =

Jean Yeuwain (c. 1566 Mons - c. 1626) was a dramatist and man of letters born in the Southern Netherlands. In 1591 he produced Hippolyte, tragédie tournée de Sénèque, a French translation of Seneca's Phaedra.

He belonged to the middle class of Mons and probably studied at the Collège de Houdain, founded in 1545 and whose buildings are today part of the Faculté polytechnique de Mons.

In 1591, he produced Hippolyte, tragédie tournée de Sénèque. The text that he used is doubtless the fine one edited by the Jesuit Antoine Delrio (1576). The translator takes liberties with the Latin text. Yeuwain had written other tragedies, which are all now lost. His brother, the poet André Yeuwain, preserved the manuscript of this one, available now available for consultation in the public library at Mons.

== Works ==
- Jean Yeuwain. Hippolyte, tragédie tournée de Sénèque (in French) – via Wikisource.
