= Hippolyte, tragédie tournée de Sénèque =

Play

Hippolyte, tragédie tournée de Sénèque is a French translation of the Latin play of Seneca, called Phaedra. Its Belgian translator, Jean Yeuwain, takes some liberties with the original. It was first published in 1591.

== Plot summary ==
Act 1: the young Hippolytus distributed to each of the people responsible, and the jobs they should have for hunting, they marked the places where they should go, and invokes the help of Diana goddess of hunting (1). Phaedra told her nurse that she burns with love for Hippolytus, the Nurse tries in vain to divert it (2). The chorus maintains that all things yield to love, men of any country, any age and any condition whatsoever, and the same Gods of Heaven and Hell, as well as all kinds of animals (3).

Act 2: the Nurse complains of the bad consequences of love, sickness and impatience, that gives in to this violent passion. Then suddenly Phaedra, disguised in the dress of an Amazon huntress to please Hippolyte (1). The Nurse tries skillfully to change the mind of Hippolytus, to make him consent to the delights of love and comforts of civilian life, but Hippolyte does not want to change his mind, and far prefers his inclinations to country life (2). Phaedra and her nurse use all kinds of tricks to attack the young man's modesty, but they can overcome it. That is why they resort to slander (3). The chorus is praying to the gods, that beauty is as advantageous to Hippolyte it was pernicious and fatal to many, and on the end sees Theseus.

Act 3: Theseus is back from Hell asks the nurse of his wife, he finds before him, the cause of the grief of his house: it tells him something else, but that Phaedra has resolved to kill (1). Phaedra first pretended she would rather die than to report the violence to Theseus that he has done: as Theseus and made threats to the nurse to tell him the truth of what happened, she shows Hippolyte had left the sword (2). Theseus has recognized the sword, and carried away by anger against his son, wished him dead (3). The chorus is complaining that as the course of heaven and everything else behaves with certain measures, but human affairs are not settled by the courts, since the righteous are persecuted and the evil are rewarded.

Act 4: a messenger tells Theseus that Hippolytus was torn to pieces by his own horses, and Neptune sends a sea monster, to the prayer of Theseus (1). The chorus gives an account of the fickleness of the great fortunes and perils which they face, recommends the safety of small and deplores the death of Hippolytus.

Act 5: Phaedra declares the innocence of Hippolytus and confesses her crime, then kills herself with hers own hand. Theseus regrets the death of his son, gives him the honors of burial, and refuses to her cruel stepmother.

== Sources ==
- Lucius Annaeus Seneca, Jean Yeuwain, Gontran van Severen, Hippolyte, tragédie tournée de Sénèque [par] Jean Yeuwain Impr. L. Dequesne, 1933
- Claude Francis, Les métamorphoses de Phèdre dans la littérature franc̃aise Recherche et choix, Éditions du Pélican, 1967
