= Giovanni Sulpizio da Veroli =

Italian Renaissance humanist and rhetorician

Giovanni Sulpizio da Veroli or Johannes Sulpitius Verulanus or Verolensis (fl. c. 1470 – 1490) was an Italian Renaissance humanist and rhetorician. Known to Erasmus, he was the author of a work on epistolary art, the proper composition and ornamentation of letters, De componendis et ornandis epistoli (c. 1475).

== Biography ==
He originated from the small commune of Veroli in Lazio, south of Rome.

Occupying the chair of grammar at the University of Rome, the Studium urbis, he joined with his master Pomponio Leto in studying the remains of Roman antiquity that lay in ruins all about them, and made impassioned pleas for the purification of Latin. In 1486 Sulpizio prepared the first printed edition of Vitruvius' De Architectura for the press; the work had long circulated in manuscripts, some of them corrupt. The volume, which also includes the text of Frontinus' De aquaeductu describing the aqueducts of Rome, was dedicated to Cardinal Riario, an enthusiastic supporter of the ideals of the Pomponian sodalitas; the dedicatory epistle urges Riario to complete the recovery of classical Roman buildings with a theatre. In his preface Sulpizio urges readers to send him emendations of the notoriously crabbed and difficult text. With Vitruvius' text in hand, Sulpizio directed the erection of a reproduction open-air Roman theater in front of Palazzo Riario in Campo dei Fiori, Rome; there, in 1486 or 1488 his students mounted the first production of a Roman tragedy that had been seen since Antiquity, in the presence of Pope Innocent VIII. The play they chose was Seneca's Phaedra, which they knew as Hippolytus.

In his concern to purify the Latin that was still being spoken as a lingua franca in educated circles, he wrote a commentary on Quintilian. The abruptness of the ending of Lucan's Pharsalia prompted him to add eleven verses, which were included in most early printed editions of Lucan's epic poem.

His Latin didactic poem, concerning the proper hygiene and table manners suited to the young student, and the pursuit of literary virtues, which lead to the other virtues, De moribus puerorum in mensa praecipue servandis, has been edited by M. Martini.
