= Alan Rowe (archaeologist) =

British archaeologist

- Rowe in The Philadelphia Inquirer, 1929
- Born: 29 October 1891
- Died: 3 January 1968 (aged 76)
- Scientific career
- Fields: Archaeology
- Institutions: Manchester University

Alan Jenvey Rowe (29 October 1891 – 3 January 1968) was a British archaeologist most famous for his studies on ancient Egypt. Rowe was an Egyptologist and lecturer in Near Eastern Archaeology in Manchester University.

== Life ==
Born in Deptford and raised in Essex, Rowe's work included Egypt, Cyrenaica, Australia, Palestine and Syria.

In August 1936, Rowe was injured in an attack in Acre. According to an interview published in The Palestine Post on 10 August, Rowe said he had been walking from the District Officer’s office toward his house when he was attacked by two Arabs, one of whom stabbed him several times in the left arm while the other pulled at his coat. Rowe reported that the coat, which contained LP.80 in cash, was taken. After receiving first aid at the police station, he returned to the scene with police, and later received medical treatment in Haifa; the newspaper reported that his injuries were not serious.

== Career ==
=== Excavations ===
Between 1923 and 1925 he took part in a core expedition to Giza. He worked from 1928 to 1931 on the pyramid of Meidum, and surrounding areas, during this time he discovered the first royal necropolis built in a style of a royal court. His work ended due to the Great Depression of 1931. In 1934 he led an expedition to Tel Gezer (midway between Jerusalem and Tel Aviv), but the locations identified for excavation turned out not to be workable.

In 1938 he led a team from Liverpool University to the Pyramid of Athribis, unfortunately the structure was already in such a heavily damaged state, preventing more thorough examinations. Between 1952 and 1957 Rowe surveyed and excavated tombs of the Necropolis of Cyrene, in the course of four campaigns. Rowe was the first to make an extensive archaeological study of the Necropolis of Cyrene, however, many artifacts from his excavations are considered to be lost. Rowe published extensive findings from excavating large parts of the Serapeum of Alexandria in 1956 together with B. R. Rees, including a detailed floor plan. Rowe and Rees 1956 suggested that statues found at the Serapeum of Alexandria and Memphis Saqqara, share a similar theme, such as with Plato's Academy mosaic.

== Publications ==
- The Four Canaanite Temples of Beth-shan, Beth-shan II:1, University Museum: Philadelphia, 1940.
- New Light on Aegypto-Cyrenaean Relations: Two Ptolemaic Statues Found in Tolmeita - l'Institut français d'archéologie orientale (1948).
- A Contribution to the Archaeology of the Western Desert: IV - The Great Serapeum of Alexandria (1956) (with B. R. Rees). in: Bulletin of the John Rylands Library; vol. 39
- A Contribution to the Archaeology of the Western Desert: I, II & III; in: Bulletin of the John Rylands Library; vols. 36 & 38
- Studies in the Archaeology of the Near East: I & II; in: Bulletin of the John Rylands Library; vols. 43 & 44
