= Plato's Academy mosaic =

Roman mosaic in Pompeii, Italy

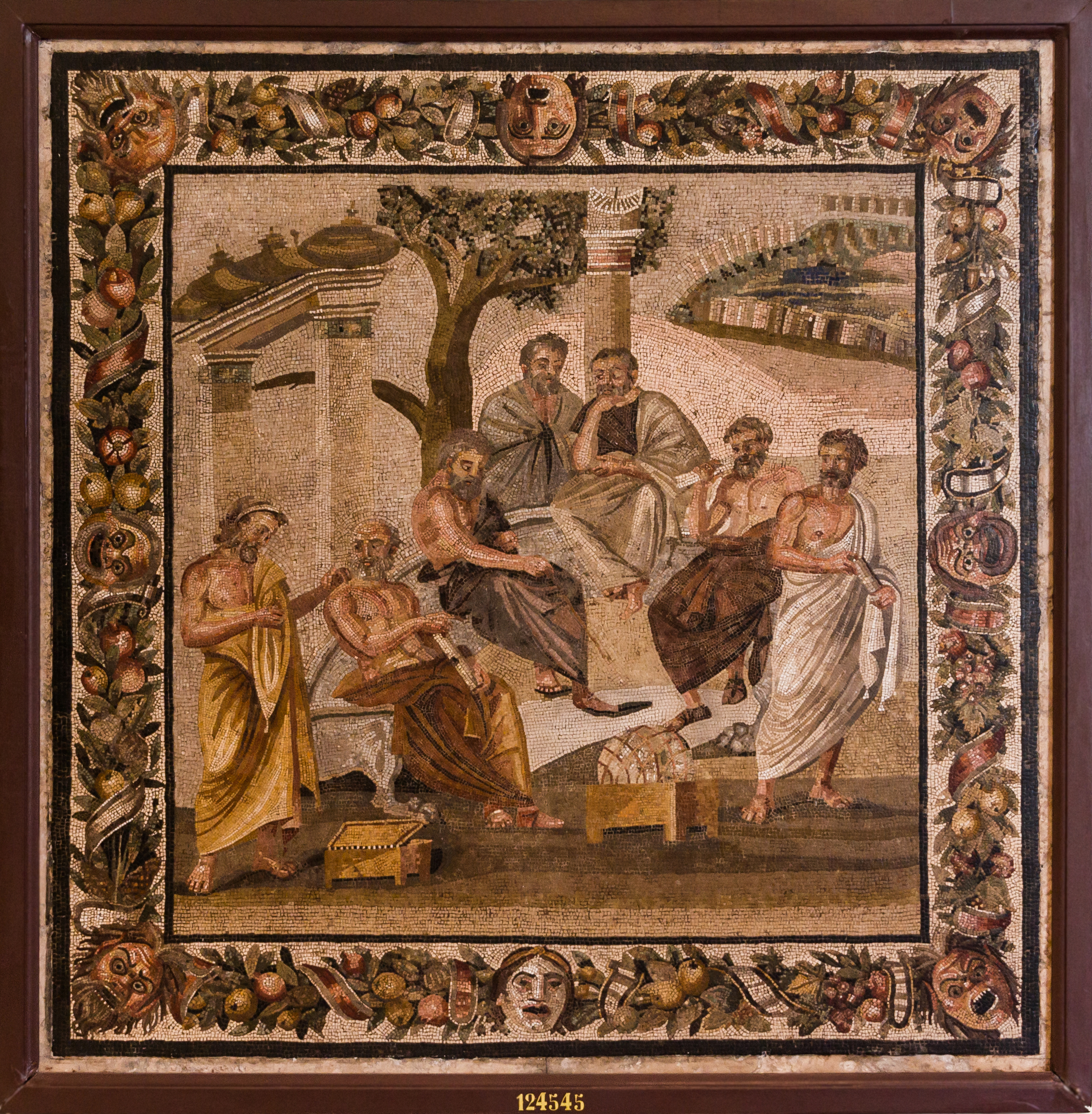
- Plato's Academy mosaic (from Pompeii)
- Year: 100 BC to 79 AD
- Dimensions: 86 cm × 85 cm (34 in × 33 in)
- Location: National Archaeological Museum of Naples, Naples

Plato's Academy mosaic is a free standing mosaic panel found in the villa of T. Siminius Stephanus in Pompeii. It is roughly a square, 86 cm x 85 cm, and can be seen presently at the National Archaeological Museum of Naples, where it is kept as item MANN 124545.

Most generally it is taken to present some variation on the topic of the Seven Sages of Ancient Greece. The figures are in classical attire of toga and sandals, gathered under a tree, against a backdrop of allusive elements, including stone columns suggestive of the grand civic architecture of the age, and glimpses of distant cliffs or havens, perhaps metaphysical in nature. Since its discovery in 1897 many hypotheses about the personages and the meaning of the representation have been proposed.

== Overview ==
Otto Brendel published in 1936 a book-length study arguing that the scene should be interpreted by focusing on the sphere seen as central for the mosaic. His reading has been challenged by pointing that the object is actually the omphalos and the depicted gathering is located at Delphi. Others have emphasized that the central figure is Plato pointing with a stick at a celestial model. Mattusch (2008) suggests for the other figures, the Greek philosophers and scholars: Thales, Anaxagoras, Pythagoras, Xenophanes, Democritus, Eudoxus, Euctemon, Callippus, Meton, Philippus, Hipparchus, and Aratus. However, Mattusch also points out that the number of figures could relate to the Seven Sages of Greece, and points out that the sages often had fluid identities. David Sedley identifies the figures as Timaeus, Eudoxus, Plato, Xenocrates, Archytas, Speusippus and Aristotle.

A strikingly similar mosaic has been found in Sarsina (now at Villa Albani) and as it has been dated after the volcanic eruption at Pompeii, a common source has been reasonably conjectured. Also Rowe and Rees noted that a set of sculptures found at Memphis showed some similarity.

== See also ==
- Villa of the Papyri
- Seven Sages of Greece
