= List of ancient Greek philosophers =

This list of ancient Greek philosophers contains philosophers who studied in ancient Greece or spoke Greek. Ancient Greek philosophy began in Miletus with the pre-Socratic philosopher Thales and lasted through Late Antiquity. Some of the most famous and influential philosophers of all time were from the ancient Greek world, including Socrates, Plato and Aristotle.

↵Abbreviations used in this list:

- c. = circa
- fl. = flourished

Name	Life	School	Notes
Acrion	5th/4th century BC	Pythagorean	visited by Plato
Adrastus of Aphrodisias	2nd century AD	Peripatetic	wrote commentaries on Aristotle's works and a commentary on Plato's Timaeus
Aedesia	5th century	Neoplatonic	wife of Hermias, and mother of Ammonius and Heliodorus
Aedesius	3rd/4th century	Neoplatonic	studied under Iamblichus before founding his own school in Pergamum
Aeneas of Gaza	5th/6th century	Neoplatonic	Christian convert who studied under Hierocles
Aenesidemus	1st century BC?	Pyrrhonist	wrote a book called Pyrrhonist Discourses which became a central text for the Pyrrhonists
Aesara	5th/4th century BC	Pythagorean	wrote On Human Nature, of which a fragment is preserved by Stobaeus
Aeschines of Neapolis	2nd/1st century BC	Academic skeptic	shared the leadership of the Academy at Athens together with Charmadas and Clitomachus about 110 BC
Aeschines of Sphettus	5th/4th century BC	Socratic	part of Socrates' circle and likely present at his death
Aetius	4th century AD	Peripatetic	Antiochean convert to Christianity who studied in Alexandria
Agapius	5th/6th century AD	Neoplatonic	studied under Marinus of Neapolis. known for his learning
Agathobulus	1st/2nd century AD	Cynic	known for his severe asceticism and teacher of Demonax
Agathosthenes	uncertain date	geographer, historian or philosopher	referred to by Tzetzes as his authority in matters connected with geography.
Agrippa the Skeptic	1st/2nd century AD	Pyrrhonist	thought to be the creator of the "five grounds of doubt"
Albinus	2nd century AD	Middle Platonist	
Alcibiades	450-404 BC	Socratic	Athenian General and Politician
Alcinous	2nd century AD?	Middle Platonist	
Alcmaeon of Croton	5th century BC	Pythagorean	interested in medicine
Alexamenus of Teos	5th century BC?	Socratic	may have been the first to write philosophical dialogues
Alexander of Aegae	1st century AD	Peripatetic	tutored the emperor Nero
Alexander of Aphrodisias	2nd/3rd century AD	Peripatetic	influential commentator on the Corpus Aristotelicum
Alexicrates	1st/2nd century AD	Pythagorean	
Alexinus	4th/3rd century BC	Megarian	founded his own school which did not fare well
Amelius	3rd century AD	Neoplatonic	student of Plotinus who wrote voluminously
Ammonius Hermiae	5th/6th century AD	Neoplatonic	
Ammonius of Athens	1st century AD	Middle Platonist	teacher of Plutarch
Ammonius Saccas	2nd/3rd century AD	Neoplatonic	Plotinus' teacher
Anaxagoras	5th century BC	Pluralist	
Anaxarchus	4th century BC	Atomist	first Greek to attempt the problem of squaring the circle
Anaxilaus	1st century BC / 1st century AD	Pythagorean	Banished from Rome for practising magic
Anaximander	7th/6th century BC	Milesian	First to conceive a mechanical model of the world
Anaximenes of Miletus	6th century BC	Milesian	
Androcydes	2nd century BC?	Pythagorean	
Andronicus of Rhodes	1st century BC	Peripatetic	
Anniceris	4th/3rd century BC	Cyrenaic	
Antiochus of Ascalon	2nd/1st century BC	Middle Platonist	
Antipater of Cyrene	4th century BC	Cyrenaic	
Antipater of Tarsus	2nd century BC	Stoic	
Antipater of Tyre	1st century BC	Stoic	
Antisthenes	5th/4th century BC	Cynic	
Antoninus	4th century AD	Neoplatonic	
Apollodorus of Athens	2nd century BC	Stoic	
Apollodorus of Seleucia	2nd century BC	Stoic	
Apollodorus the Epicurean	2nd century BC	Epicurean	
Apollonius Cronus	4th century BC	Megarian	
Apollonius of Tyana	1st century AD	Neopythagorean	
Apollonius of Tyre	1st century BC	Stoic	
Arcesilaus	4th/3rd century BC	Academic skeptic	
Archedemus of Tarsus	2nd century BC	Stoic	
Archelaus	5th century BC	Pluralist	
Archytas	5th/4th century BC	Pythagorean	
Arete of Cyrene	4th century BC	Cyrenaic	
Arignote	6th/5th century BC	Pythagorean	
Aristarchus of Samos	4th/3rd century BC	Academic skeptic	presented the first known model that placed the Sun at the center of the known universe with the Earth revolving around it.
Aristippus	5th/4th century BC	Cyrenaic	
Aristippus the Younger	4th century BC	Cyrenaic	
Aristoclea	fl. 6th century BC		
Aristocles of Messene	1st century AD?	Peripatetic	
Aristocreon	3rd/2nd century BC	Stoic	
Aristo of Alexandria	2nd /1st century BC	Peripatetic	
Aristo of Ceos	3rd/2nd century BC	Peripatetic	
Aristo of Chios	4th/3rd century BC	Stoic	
Aristotle	4th century BC	Peripatetic	founder of Peripatetic school; student of Plato
Aristotle of Cyrene	4th/3rd century BC	Cyrenaic	
Aristotle of Mytilene	2nd century AD	Peripatetic	
Aristoxenus	4th century BC	Peripatetic	
Arius Didymus	1st century BC	Stoic	
Asclepiades of Phlius	4th/3rd century BC	Eretrian	
Asclepiades the Cynic	4th century AD	Cynic	
Asclepigenia	5th/6th century AD	Neoplatonic	
Asclepiodotus	1st century BC		
Asclepiodotus of Alexandria	5th century AD	Neoplatonic	
Aspasius	2nd century AD	Peripatetic	
Athenaeus of Seleucia	1st century BC	Peripatetic	
Athenodoros Cananites	1st century BC	Stoic	
Athenodoros Cordylion	2nd /1st century BC	Stoic	
Athenodorus of Soli	3rd century BC	Stoic	
Attalus	1st century BC - 1st century AD	Stoic	
Atticus	2nd century AD	Middle Platonist	
Basilides (Stoic)	2nd century BC	Stoic	Denied the existence of incorporeal entities
Basilides the Epicurean	3rd/2nd century BC	Epicurean	Succeeded Dionysius of Lamptrai as the head of the Epicurean school at Athens
Batis of Lampsacus	3rd century BC	Epicurean	
Bion of Borysthenes	4th/3rd century BC	Cynic	Once was a slave, later to be released
Boethus	4th century BC	Platonist	
Boethus the Epicurean	1st century AD	Epicurean	
Boethus of Sidon	1st century BC	Peripatetic	
Boethus of Sidon	2nd century BC	Stoic	
Bolus of Mendes	fl. 3rd century BC	Pythagorean	
Brontinus	fl. 6th century BC	Pythagorean	
Bryson of Achaea	fl. 330 BC	Megarian	
Callicles	5th century BCE	Sophist?	
Calliphon	2nd century BC	Peripatetic	
Calliphon of Croton	6th century BC	Pythagorean	
Callistratus	fl. 3rd century AD	Sophist	
Carneades	c. 214 – 129/8 BC	Academic skeptic	
Carneiscus	c. 300 BC	Epicurean	
Cassius Longinus	c. 213–273	Middle Platonist	
Cebes	c. 430–350 BC	Pythagorean	
Celsus	2nd century		
Cercidas	3rd century BC	Cynic	
Cercops		Pythagorean	
Chaerephon	c. 470/460 – 403/399 BCE	Socratic	
Chamaeleon	350-275 BC	Peripatetic	
Charmadas	164 - c. 95 BC	Academic skeptic	
Chrysanthius	fl. 4th century	Neoplatonic	
Chrysippus	279-206 BC	Stoic	
Cleanthes	330-230 BC	Stoic	
Clearchus of Soli	4th/3rd century BC (fl. 320 BC)	Peripatetic	
Cleinias of Tarentum	4th century BC	Pythagorean	
Cleomedes		Stoic	
Cleomenes	fl. c. 300 BC	Cynic	
Clinomachus	4th century BC	Megarian	
Clitomachus	187 - 109 BC	Academic skeptic	
Colotes	320-268 BC	Epicurean	
Crantor	born c. 350 BC	Academic Platonist	
Crates of Athens	died 268-265 BC	Academic Platonist	
Crates of Mallus	fl. 2nd century BC	Stoic	
Crates of Thebes	c. 365 – c. 285 BC	Cynic	husband of Hipparchia of Maroneia
Cratippus of Pergamon	1st century BC	Peripatetic	friend of Cicero
Cratylus	5th century BC	Ephesian	
Crescens the Cynic	2nd century	Cynic	
Crinis	1st/2nd century BC	Stoic	
Critolaus	c. 200 – c. 118 BC	Peripatetic	
Cronius	fl. 2nd century A.D.	Neopythagorean	
Damascius	born c. 458, died after 538	Neoplatonic	
Damis	1st/2nd century A.D.	Neopythagorean	
Damo	5th century BC	Pythagorean	reportedly the daughter of Pythagoras and Theano
Dardanus of Athens	160-85 BC	Stoic	one of the several leaders of Stoa after the death of Panaetius
Demetrius Lacon	fl. late 2nd century BC	Epicurean	
Demetrius of Amphipolis	fl. 4th century BC	Academic Platonist	
Demetrius Phalereus	c. 350 – c. 280 BC	Peripatetic	Governed Athens
Demetrius the Cynic	fl. 1st century	Cynic	
Democrates	unknown	Pythagorean?	
Democritus	c. 460 – c. 370 BC	Presocratic, Atomist	
Demonax		Cynic	
Dexippus	fl. 350	Neoplatonic	
Diagoras of Melos		Sophist	
Dicaearchus		Peripatetic	
Dio of Alexandria	fl. 1st century BC	Academic skeptic	
Dio Chrysostom		Sophist	
Diocles of Cnidus	fl. 3rd or 2nd century BC?	Academic Platonist	
Diodorus Cronus		Megarian	
Diodorus of Adramyttium	fl. 1st century BC	Academic skeptic	
Diodorus of Aspendus		Pythagorean	
Diodorus of Tyre		Peripatetic	
Diodotus		Stoic	
Diogenes of Apollonia		Presocratic	
Diogenes of Babylon		Stoic	
Diogenes of Oenoanda		Epicurean	
Diogenes of Seleucia		Epicurean	
Diogenes of Sinope	412/404 - 323 BC	Cynic	Lived in a clay wine jar
Diogenes of Tarsus		Epicurean	
Dionysius of Chalcedon		Megarian	
Dionysius of Cyrene		Stoic	
Dionysius of Lamptrai		Epicurean	
Dionysius the Renegade		Stoic	abandoned Stoicism for Cyrenaicism
Dios	fl. 7th century BC ?	Pythagorean	
Diotima of Mantinea			
Diotimus		Stoic	
Domninus of Larissa	c. 420 - c. 480	Neoplatonic	
Echecrates		Pythagorean	
Ecphantus		Pythagorean	
Empedocles		Presocratic, Pluralist	
Epicharmus of Kos		Pythagorean	
Epictetus		Stoic	wrote The Enchiridion, a handbook of Stoic ethical advice
Epicurus		Epicurean	said that the purpose of philosophy was to attain tranquility characterized by ataraxia
Eubulides		Megarian	
Euclid of Megara		Megarian	
Eudemus of Rhodes		Peripatetic	
Eudorus of Alexandria		Peripatetic	
Eudoxus of Cnidus	410/408 – 355/347 BC	Academic Platonist	
Euenus		Sophist	
Euphantus		Megarian	
Euphraeus			
Euphrates		Stoic	
Eurytus		Pythagorean	
Eusebius of Myndus	fl. 4th century	Neoplatonic	
Eustathius of Cappadocia	c. 400	Neoplatonic	
Evander	fl. c. 215 - c. 205	Academic skeptic	
Favorinus		Academic skeptic	
Gaius the Platonist	fl. 2nd century	Middle Platonist	
Geminus		Stoic	
Gorgias		Sophist	
Hagnon of Tarsus	fl. 2nd century BC	Academic skeptic	
Hecataeus of Abdera		Pyrrhonist	
Hecato of Rhodes		Stoic	
Hegesias of Cyrene		Cyrenaic	
Hegesinus of Pergamon	fl. c. 160 BC	Academic skeptic	
Hegias	fl. c. 500	Neoplatonic	
Heliodorus of Alexandria	fl. 5th century	Neoplatonic	
Heraclides Lembus			
Heraclides Ponticus	387 - 312 BC	Academic Platonist	
Heraclitus		Presocratic, Ephesian	claimed that "You cannot step in the same river twice" and "All is fire."
Heraclius		Cynic	
Herillus of Carthage		Stoic	
Hermagoras of Amphipolis		Stoic	
Hermarchus		Epicurean	
Hermias	born c. 410 - died c. 450	Neoplatonic	
Herminus		Peripatetic	
Hermippus of Smyrna		Peripatetic	
Hermotimus of Clazomenae			
Hicetas		Pythagorean	
Hierius	fl c. 500	Neoplatonic	
Hierocles of Alexandria	fl. c. 430	Neoplatonic	
Hierocles (Stoic)	2nd century CE	Stoic	
Hieronymus of Rhodes	c. 290 – c. 230 BC	Peripatetic	
Himerius		Sophist	
Hipparchia of Maroneia	fl. c. 325 BC	Cynic	Genus of butterflies, Hipparchia (butterfly), named after her
Hippasus		Pythagorean	
Hippias		Sophist	
Hippo	5th century BC	Presocratic	
Horus		Cynic	
Hypatia of Alexandria	born 350-370 – 415	Neoplatonic	
Iamblichus	c. 245-c. 325	Neoplatonic	
Ichthyas		Megarian	
Idomeneus of Lampsacus		Epicurean	
Ion of Chios		Pythagorean	
Isidore of Alexandria	fl. c. 475	Neoplatonic	
Jason of Nysa		Stoic	
Lacydes of Cyrene	before 241 - c. 205 BC	Academic skeptic	
Leonteus of Lampsacus		Epicurean	
Leontion		Epicurean	
Leucippus		Presocratic, Atomist	
Lyco of Iasos		Pythagorean	
Lyco of Troas		Peripatetic	
Lycophron		Sophist	
Lysis of Taras		Pythagorean	
Marinus of Neapolis	born c. 450	Neoplatonic	
Maximus of Ephesus	died 372	Neoplatonic	
Maximus of Tyre	fl. 2nd century	Middle Platonist	
Meleager of Gadara		Cynic	
Melissus of Samos		Presocratic, Eleatic	
Menedemus		Eretrian	
Menedemus of Pyrrha	fl. c. 350 BC	Academic Platonist	
Menedemus the Cynic		Cynic	
Menippus		Cynic	
Metrocles		Cynic	
Metrodorus of Athens			
Metrodorus of Chios		Atomist	
Metrodorus of Cos		Pythagorean	
Metrodorus of Lampsacus (the elder)		Presocratic	
Metrodorus of Lampsacus (the younger)		Epicurean	
Metrodorus of Stratonicea	fl. 2nd century BC	Academic skeptic	
Mnesarchus of Athens		Stoic	
Moderatus of Gades		Neopythagorean	
Monimus		Cynic	
Myia		Pythagorean	
Nausiphanes		Atomist	
Nicarete of Megara		Megarian	
Nicolaus of Damascus			
Nicomachus		Neopythagorean	
Nicomachus (son of Aristotle)		Peripatetic	
Numenius of Apamea	fl. c. 275	Neopythagorean	
Nymphidianus of Smyrna	fl. c. 360	Neoplatonic	
Ocellus Lucanus		Pythagorean	
Oenomaus of Gadara		Cynic	
Olympiodorus the Elder		Peripatetic	
Olympiodorus the Younger	c. 495-570	Neoplatonic	
Onasander	fl. 1st century	Middle Platonist	
Onatas		Pythagorean	
Origen the Pagan	fl. c. 250	Middle Platonist	
Panaetius		Stoic	
Pancrates of Athens		Cynic	
Panthoides		Megarian	
Parmenides of Elea		Presocratic, Eleatic	held that the only thing that exists is being itself; teacher of Zeno of Elea
Pasicles of Thebes		Megarian	
Patro the Epicurean		Epicurean	
Peregrinus Proteus		Cynic	
Persaeus		Stoic	
Phaedo of Elis		Eretrian	Originally founded the School of Elis; it was later transferred to Eretria by his pupil Menedemus.
Phaedrus		Epicurean	
Phanias of Eresus		Peripatetic	
Phanto of Phlius		Pythagorean	
Philip of Opus	fl. 4th century BC	Academic	
Philiscus of Aegina		Cynic	
Philiscus of Thessaly		Sophist	
Philo	20 BC - 50 AD	Middle Platonist	
Philo of Larissa	159/158 – 84/83 BC	Academic skeptic	
Philo the Dialectician		Megarian	
Philodemus		Epicurean	
Philolaus		Pythagorean	
Philonides of Laodicea		Epicurean	
Philostratus		Sophist	
Phintys		Pythagorean	
Plato	428/427 - 348/347 BC	Academic	student of Socrates and teacher of Aristotle; famous for the Theory of Forms
Plotinus	c. 204 – 270	Neoplatonic	
Plutarch	c. 46 – 120	Middle Platonist	
Plutarch of Athens	c. 350 – 430	Neoplatonic	
Polemarchus			
Polemon of Athens		Stoic	
Polemon of Athens (scholarch)	before 314 - 270/269 BC	Academic	
Polemon of Laodicea		Sophist	
Polus			
Polyaenus of Lampsacus		Epicurean	
Polystratus		Epicurean	
Porphyry	234 – c. 305	Neoplatonic	taught by Plotinus; wrote the Isagoge, an introduction to Aristotle's "Categories",
Posidonius		Stoic	
Potamo of Alexandria		Eclecticism	
Praxiphanes		Peripatetic	
Priscian of Lydia	fl. c. 550	Neoplatonic	
Priscus of Epirus	c. 305-c. 395	Neoplatonic	
Proclus	412 – 485	Neoplatonic	
Proclus of Laodicea			
Proclus Mallotes		Stoic	
Prodicus		Sophist	
Protagoras		Sophist	
Ptolemy-el-Garib	fl. c. 300 AD	Peripatetic	
Pyrrho		Pyrrhonist	credited as being the first skeptic philosopher
Pythagoras	c. 570 – c. 495 BC	Pythagorean	Credited with discovering the Pythagorean theorem
Sallustius		Neoplatonic	
Sallustius of Emesa		Cynic	
Satyrus		Peripatetic	
Secundus the Silent		Cynic	
Sextus of Chaeronea			
Sextus Empiricus		Pyrrhonist	
Simmias of Thebes		Pythagorean	
Simon the Shoemaker		Socratic	
Simplicius of Cilicia	c. 490 - c. 560	Neoplatonic	
Siro		Epicurean	
Socrates	c. 469–399 BC	Socratic	considered one of the founders of Western philosophy; credited as being the first moral philosopher
Sopater of Apamea	died before 337	Neoplatonic	
Sosigenes		Peripatetic	
Sosipatra	fl. c. 325	Neoplatonic	
Sotion		Neopythagorean	
Speusippus	c. 407 – 339 BC	Academic	
Sphaerus		Stoic	
Stilpo		Megarian	
Strato of Lampsacus		Peripatetic	
Syrianus	died c. 437	Neoplatonic	
Telauges		Pythagorean	
Telecles of Phocis	died 167/166 BC	Academic skeptic	
Teles the Cynic		Cynic	
Thales of Miletus	c. 626/623 – c. 548/545 BC	Presocratic, Milesian	first philosopher; held that the first principle (arche) is water; one of the Seven Sages of Greece
Theagenes of Patras		Cynic	
Theano		Pythagorean	
Themista of Lampsacus		Epicurean	
Themistius		Neoplatonic	
Theodorus of Asine	fl. 3rd century	Neoplatonic	
Theodorus the Atheist	c. 340 – c. 250 BCE	Cyrenaic	
Theon of Smyrna		Neopythagorean	
Theophrastus		Peripatetic	
Thrasymachus		Sophist	
Thrasymachus of Corinth		Megarian	
Timaeus of Locri		Pythagorean	
Timaeus the Sophist	fl. between 1st and 4th centuries	Middle Platonist	
Timon		Pyrrhonist	
Timycha		Pythagorean	
Tisias		Sophist	
Xenarchus of Seleucia		Peripatetic	
Xeniades		Pyrrhonist	
Xenocrates	c. 396 – 314 BC	Academic	
Xenophanes of Colophon		Presocratic, Eleatic	claimed that if oxen were able to imagine gods, those gods would be in the image of oxen
Xenophilus		Pythagorean	friend and teacher of Aristoxenus
Xenophon			
Zenobius	2nd century A.D.	Sophist	flourished in the times of the emperor Hadrian
Zenodotus	fl. c. 475	Neoplatonic	described as "the darling of Proclus"
Zeno of Citium	334-262 BC	Stoic	founder of the Stoic school of philosophy
Zeno of Elea		Presocratic, Eleatic	famous creator of Zeno's paradoxes
Zeno of Sidon	150-75 BC	Epicurean	sometimes termed the "leading Epicurean"
Zeno of Tarsus	fl. 200 BC	Stoic	

== See also ==
- List of ancient Platonists
- List of Cynic philosophers
- List of Epicurean philosophers
- List of Stoic philosophers
