= List of ancient Platonists =

Platonists are followers of Platonism, the philosophy of Plato. Platonism can be said to have begun when Plato founded his academy c. 385 BC. Ancient Platonism went on to last until the end of the last remaining pagan school of Platonism in Alexandria which was brought on by the Muslim conquest of Egypt in 641, over a thousand years after the opening of the first Platonic school. Platonism had an immense impact on the intellectual life of the ancient world eventually becoming the dominant philosophy of late antiquity.

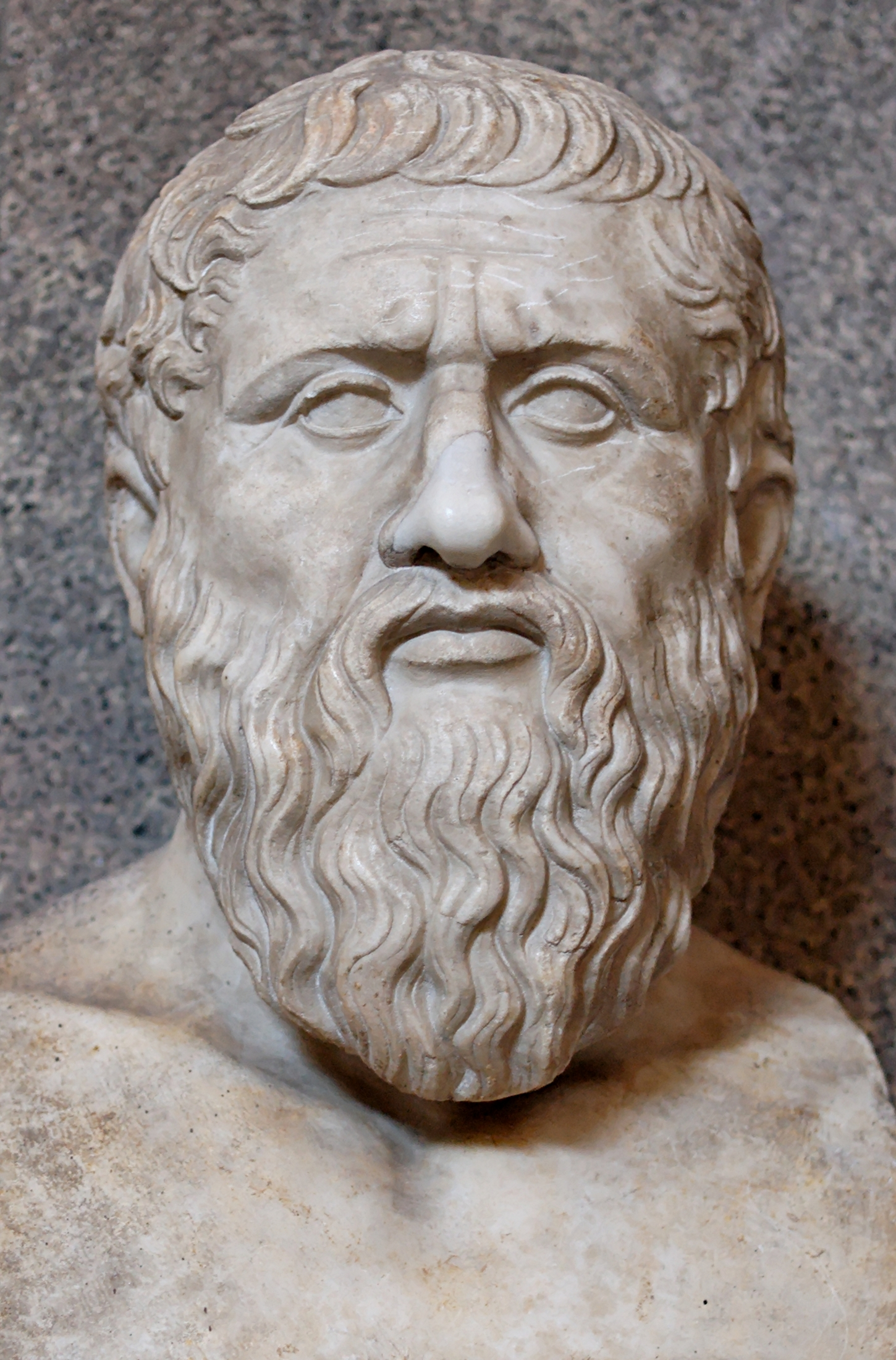
Bust of Plato

Name	Period	School
Aedesia	fl. 5th century	Neoplatonist
Aedesius	died 355	Neoplatonist
Aeneas of Gaza	fl. 5th century / died c. 518	Neoplatonist
Aeschines of Neapolis	fl. c. 110 BC	New Academy
Agapius	fl. 5th – 6th century	Neoplatonist
Albinus	fl. c. 150	Middle Platonist
Alcinous	fl. c. 2nd century	Middle Platonist
Ambrosius Theodosius Macrobius	fl. 395 – 423	Neoplatonist
Amelius	fl. c. 250 – 300	Neoplatonist
Ammonius Hermiae	c. 440 – c. 520	Neoplatonist
Ammonius of Athens	fl. 1st century	Middle Platonist
Ammonius Saccas	fl. 3rd century	Neoplatonist
Antiochus of Ascalon	c. 130 BC – 68/67 BC	Middle Platonist
Antoninus	fl. 4th century	Neoplatonist
Apuleius	c. 125 – c. 180	Middle Platonist
Arcesilaus	c. 316 BC – c. 241 BC	Middle Academy
Aristonymus	fl. 4th century BC	Academy
Asclepigenia	fl. 430	Neoplatonist
Asclepiodotus of Alexandria	fl. c. 550-600	Neoplatonist
Atticus	fl. c. 175	Middle Platonist
Augustine of Hippo	354 – 430 AD	Neoplatonist
Axiothea of Phlius	fl. 4th century BC	Academy
Boethius	c. 477–524 AD	Neoplatonist
Calippus of Syracuse	died 351/0 BC	Academy
Carneades of Carnea	c. 214 BC – 129/8 BC	New Academy
Cassius Longinus	c. 213–273	Middle Platonist
Charmadas	164 BC – c. 95 BC	New Academy
Chaeron of Pellene	fl. 4th century BC	Academy
Chrysanthius of Sardis	fl. 4th century	Neoplatonist
Clement of Alexandria	c. 150 – c. 215	Middle Platonist
Clitomachus	187 BC – 109 BC	New Academy
Coriscus of Scepsis	fl. 4th century BC	Academy
Crantor	born c. 350 BC	Academy
Crates of Athens	died 268–265 BC	Academy
Damascius	born c. 458, died after 538	Neoplatonist
Demetrius of Amphipolis	fl. 4th century BC	Academy
Dexippus	fl. 350	Neoplatonist
Dio of Alexandria	fl. 1st century BC	New Academy
Diocles of Cnidus	fl. 3rd or 2nd century BC?	Middle Academy
Diodorus of Adramyttium	fl. 1st century BC	New Academy
Domninus of Larissa	c. 420 – c. 480	Neoplatonist
Erastus of Scepsis	fl. 4th century BC	Academy
Euaeon of Lampsacus	fl. 4th century BC	Academy
Eudoxus of Cnidus	410/408 BC – 355/347 BC	Academy
Eusebius of Myndus	fl. 4th century	Neoplatonist
Eustathius of Cappadocia	c. 400	Neoplatonist
Evander	fl. c. 215 – c. 205	Middle Academy
Gaius the Platonist	fl. 2nd century	Middle Platonist
Hagnon of Tarsus	fl. 2nd century BC	New Academy
Hegesinus of Pergamon	fl. c. 160 BC	Middle Academy
Hegias	fl. c. 500	Neoplatonist
Heliodorus of Alexandria	fl. 5th century	Neoplatonist
Heraclides of Aenus	fl. 4th century	Academy
Heraclides Ponticus	387 BC – 312 BC	Academy
Hermias	born c. 410 – died c. 450	Neoplatonist
Hermodorus of Syracuse	fl. 4th century BC	Academy
Hestiaeus of Perinthus	fl. 4th century BC	Academy
Hierius	fl c. 500	Neoplatonist
Hierocles of Alexandria	fl. c. 430	Neoplatonist
Hypatia of Alexandria	born 350-370 – 415	Neoplatonist
Iamblichus Chalcidensis	c. 245 – c. 325	Neoplatonist
Isidore of Alexandria	fl. c. 475	Neoplatonist
Lacydes of Cyrene	before 241 – c. 205 BC	Middle Academy
Lastheneia of Mantinea	fl. 4th century BC	Academy
Marinus of Neapolis	born c. 450	Neoplatonist
Maximus of Ephesus	died 372	Neoplatonist
Maximus of Tyre	fl. 2nd century	Middle Platonist
Menedemus of Pyrrha	fl. c. 350 BC	Academy
Metrodorus of Stratonicea	fl. 2nd century BC	New Academy
Numenius of Apamea	fl. c. 275	Middle Platonist
Nymphidianus of Smyrna	fl. c. 360	Neoplatonist
Olympiodorus the Younger	c. 495 – 570	Neoplatonist
Onasander	fl. 1st century	Middle Platonist
Origen	c. 184 – c. 253	Neoplatonist
Origen the Pagan	fl. c. 250	Middle Platonist
Philip of Opus	fl. 4th century BC	Academy
Philo of Alexandria	20 BC – 50 AD	Middle Platonist
Philo of Larissa	159/158 BC – 84/83 BC	New Academy
Plato	428/427 BC – 348/347 BC	Academy
Plotinus	c. 204 – 270	Neoplatonist
Plutarch	c. 46 – 120	Middle Platonist
Plutarch of Athens	c. 350 – 430	Neoplatonist
Polemon	before 314 BC – 270/269 BC	Academy
Porphyry of Tyre	234 – c. 305	Neoplatonist
Priscian of Lydia	fl. c. 550	Neoplatonist
Priscus of Epirus	c. 305 – c. 395	Neoplatonist
Proclus Lycaeus	412 – 485	Neoplatonist
Pseudo-Dionysius the Areopagite	fl. 500	Neoplatonist
Python of Aenus	fl. 4th century BC	Academy
Simplicius of Cilicia	c. 490 – c. 560	Neoplatonist
Sopater of Apamea	died before 337	Neoplatonist
Sosipatra of Ephesus	fl. c. 325	Neoplatonist
Speusippus	c. 407 BC – 339 BC	Academy
Synesius	c. 373 – c. 414	Neoplatonist
Syrianus	died c. 437	Neoplatonist
Telecles of Phocis	died 167/1666 BC	Middle Academy
Theodorus of Asine	fl. 3rd century	Neoplatonist
Timaeus the Sophist	fl. between 1st and 4th centuries	Middle Platonist
Timolaus of Cyzicus	fl. 4th century BC	Academy
Xenocrates of Chalcedon	c. 396 BC – 314 BC	Academy
Zenodotus	fl. c. 475	Neoplatonist

== See also ==
- List of ancient Greek philosophers
- List of Cynic philosophers
- List of Epicurean philosophers
- List of Stoic philosophers
