= Metrodorus =

Metrodorus (Greek: Μητρόδωρος, romanized: Mētrodōros, lit. 'mother's gift') is a Greek masculine given name. Notable persons with the name include:

- Metrodorus of Lampsacus (the elder) (5th century BC), philosopher from the school of Anaxagoras
- Metrodorus of Cos (5th century BC), Pythagorean writer
- Metrodorus of Chios (4th century BC), philosopher from the school of Democritus
- Metrodorus of Lampsacus (the younger) (331–278 BC), Epicurean philosopher
- Metrodorus of Athens (mid 2nd century BC), philosopher and painter
- Metrodorus of Stratonicea (late 2nd century BC), philosopher, originally Epicurean, later a follower of Carneades
- Metrodorus of Scepsis (c. 145 BC – 70 BC), writer, orator and politician
- Metrodorus (grammarian) (c. 6th century AD), grammarian and mathematician who collected the mathematical epigrams in the Greek Anthology
- Metrodorus (4th century BC), physician who married Aristotle's daughter Pythias
- Metrodorus (late 3rd, early 2nd century BC), general in the employ of Philip V of Macedon during the Cretan War

== Fictional characters ==
- Mitrodor (Russified form), fictional character in Nikolai Nekrasov's poem Who Can Be Happy and Free in Russia?
