= Philiscus =

Philiscus may refer to:

- Philiscus of Athens comic poet
- Philiscus of Aegina (4th century BC) Cynic philosopher
- Philiscus of Abydos (4th century BC)
- Philiscus of Miletus rhetorician, see Neanthes of Cyzicus
- Philiscus of Melos philosopher
- Philiscus of Thasos
- Philiscus of Corcyra (c. 300 BC) tragic poet
- Philiscus of Rhodes sculptor, see Temple of Apollo Sosianus
- Alcaeus and Philiscus (2nd-century BC) two Epicurean philosophers expelled from Rome in either 173 BC or 154 BC.
- Philiscus of Thessaly (2nd-3rd century) Sophist
- Stefanus Philiscus of Soncino (15th century) Italian scholar
