= Menedemus (disambiguation) =

Menedemus was a Greek philosopher and founder of the Eretrian school.

Menedemus may also refer to:

- Menedemus (general), one of the generals of Alexander the Great
- Menedemus of Pyrrha, a member of Plato's Academy
- Menedemus the Cynic, a Cynic philosopher
- Menedemus (insect), a genus of shield bugs in the tribe Sciocorini
