= Metrodorus of Lampsacus =

Metrodorus of Lampsacus may refer to two Greek philosophers:

- Metrodorus of Lampsacus (the elder) (5th century BC) - philosopher from the school of Anaxagoras
- Metrodorus of Lampsacus (the younger) (331–278 BC) - Epicurean philosopher

== See also ==
- Metrodorus (disambiguation)
