= Bitale =

5th century BCE Greek woman

Bitale (Ancient Greek: Βιτάλη) was the daughter of the Pythagorean philosopher Damo, who was the daughter of Pythagoras. She married her uncle, the philosopher Telauges, and was therefore both the granddaughter of Pythagoras as well as his daughter-in-law. She lived around the 5th century BCE.

Iamblichus wrote that Pythagoras's hypomnemata—his unpublished secret notes—were passed down to her.

Some scholars have expressed doubt that a historical Bitale ever existed.
