= Ludovico Nogarola =

Italian intellectual

Lodovico Nogarola (born August 30, 1490 - died 1558) was an Italian Renaissance humanist, politician, and man of letters.

== Biography ==
Lodovico Nogarola was born of an ancient noble family of Verona. He applied himself to the study of the Greek language, and acquired a high reputation by the various Latin versions of books written in that tongue. He was sent to the council of Trent, where he served as secretary at the theological discussions and gained much applause by a discourse pronounced by him on Saint Stephen's Day before the assembled legates and bishops. Nogarola's sermon is printed under the title: Oratio L. Nogarolae comitis habita in Concilio Tridentino divi Stephani celebritate MDXLV (Venice 1549). He died at Verona in 1558.

== Works ==
Of his many writings a large number remained unpublished. In 1549 he published at Venice, Apostolicæ Institutiones in parvum Libellum collectæ, to which he annexed his discourse delivered before the council of Trent. He also published Timotheus, sive de Nilo; Platonicæ Plutarchi Quæstiones in Latinum versæ, et Annotationibus illustratæ; a translation of a work of Ocellus Lucanus, De Universa Natura; Letter to Adamo Fumano, Canon of Verona, on the Persons of illustrious Italian Families who have written in Greek; this is given in the Supplementa et Observationes ad Vossium de Historicis Græcis et Latinis, by Johann Albert Fabricius, published at Hamburg in 1709; Scholia ad Themistii Paraphrasim in Aristotelis Librum Tertium de Anima, with a Latin translation of that work; and Disputatio super Reginæ Britannorum Divortio, a work on the divorce of Henry VIII and Catherine of Aragon.

== Bibliography ==
- von Druffel, August (1875). "Ueber den Grafen Ludwig von Nogarola und das Trienter Concil". Sitzungsberichte der philosophisch-philologischen und historische Klasse der Bayerische Akademie der Wissenschaften (in German). I (2): 426–456.
- Jedin, Hubert (1942). "Un laico al Concilio di Trento: il conte Lodovico Nogarola". Il Concilio di Trento: Rivista Commemorativa del IV Centenario (in Italian). 1: 25–33.
- Rhodes, Dennis E. (1990). "Count Lodovico Nogarola and the divorce of Catherine of Aragon". The British Library Journal. 16 (1): 100–102. JSTOR 42554297.
- Lakeland, Paul (2006). "The Laity". From Trent to Vatican II. Historical and Theological Investigations: 193–208. doi:10.1093/0195178068.003.0011. ISBN 0195178068.
- Pellegrini, Paolo (2013). "NOGAROLA, Ludovico". Dizionario Biografico degli Italiani (in Italian). Vol. 78: Natta–Nurra. Rome: Istituto dell'Enciclopedia Italiana. ISBN 978-88-12-00032-6.
- Rose, Hugh James; Rose, Henry John; Wright, Thomas (1857). A new general biographical dictionary. London: T. Fellowes.
