= FPG =

FPG may refer to:

- Fasting plasma glucose
- Fisher Poets Gathering, an American poetry festival
- Formamidopyrimidine DNA glycosylase
- Formosa Plastics Group, a Taiwanese conglomerate
- Fragmenta Philosophorum Graecorum, a collection of fragments of ancient Greek philosophical texts
- Frederick Philip Grove (1879–1948), German-born Canadian novelist and translator.
- Galician People's Front (Spanish: Frente Popular Galega), a regional political party in Spain
- Federal Poverty Guidelines (in the US)
