= Lycon =

Lycon may refer to:

- Lycon, a son of King Hippocoon of Sparta in Greek mythology
- Lycon, a prosecutor in the trial of Socrates mentioned in Plato's dialogue, the Apology
- Lyco of Iasos (4th century BC) Pythagorean philosopher
- Lyco of Troas (3rd century BC) Peripatetic philosopher
- Asyut, Egypt, a city whose Latin name was Lycon
