= Aeschines (disambiguation) =

Aeschines was an Athenian orator, one of ten Attic orators.

Aeschines or Aischines may also refer to:

- Aeschines of Miletus, lesser known orator, and contemporary of Cicero
- Aeschines of Neapolis (c. 110 BC), academic philosopher
- Aeschines (physician), physician who lived in the latter half of the 4th century
- Aeschines of Sphettus (or Aeschines Socraticus), follower of Socrates and author of Socratic dialogues
- Aeschines, one of the Thirty Tyrants
