= Memorabilia (disambiguation) =

Memorabilia are objects treasured for their memories or historical interest.

Memorabilia may also refer to:

- Memorabilia (event), a British fan convention for collectors of memorabilia
- Memorabilia (Xenophon), a collection of Socratic dialogues by Xenophon
- Memorabilia – The Singles, a 1991 compilation album by Soft Cell and Marc Almond
- "Memorabilia", a 1980 song by Soft Cell
- "Memorabilia" (The Flash), an episode of the American TV series

== See also ==
- Hypomnemata (set index article)
