= Oenomaus (disambiguation) =

Oenomaus may refer to:

- Oenomaus, a king of Pisa in Greek mythology
- Oenomaus (butterfly), a gossamer-winged butterfly genus
- Oenomaus (rebel slave) (c. 72 BC), Gallic rebel gladiator who fought in the Third Servile War
- Oenomaus of Gadara (2nd century AD), Cynic philosopher
