= Timolaus =

Timolaus may refer to:

- Timolaus and companions
- Timolaus of Cyzicus
- Timolaus of Palmyra
