= Timaeus (historian) =

Greek historian (died c. 260 BC)

Timaeus of Tauromenium (Ancient Greek: Τιμαῖος; born 356 or 350 BC; died c. 260 BC) was an ancient Greek historian. He was widely regarded by ancient authors as the most influential historian between the time of Ephorus (4th century BC) and Polybius (2nd century BC). In the words of scholar Lionel I. C. Pearson, Timaeus "maintained his position as the standard authority on the history of the Greek West for nearly five centuries."

== Biography ==
Timaeus was born c. 356 or c. 350 BC in Tauromenium (modern Taormina, in eastern Sicily), to a wealthy and influential Greek family. His father, Andromachus, was a dynast who had refounded Tauromenium in 358 with former inhabitants of Naxos (destroyed by Dionysius I in 403), and ruled there with Timoleon's support.

Some time after 316 BC, perhaps in 315 or 312, Timaeus is said to have been banished from Sicily by Agathocles, the tyrant of Syracuse, possibly because of Timaeus' hostility towards him after the tyrant had captured Tauromenium. Some scholars have suggested that he left Sicily earlier, although most researchers agree that he was forced out in the 310s, rather than leaving voluntarily as a young man.

Timaeus spent at least fifty years in Athens. It is not clear if he ever returned to Sicily. Scholar Christopher A. Baron writes that Timaeus may never have returned to his homeland, even after Agathocles' death in 289 BC, while Craige B. Champion argues that he may have come back under the reign of Hiero II (ca. 271–216).

While in Athens, Timaeus wrote a history of the Greek West down to 289 BC, and another chronicling the wars of Pyrrhus continuing to 264 BC. Claims that he studied under Philiscus of Miletus, a pupil of Isocrates, remain uncertain and may stem from later attempts to link Timaeus stylistically with Isocrates.

He died shortly after 264 BC, likely around 260 BC. According to Pseudo-Lucian, he reached the age of 96.

== Work ==
While in Athens, he completed his great historical work, the Histories, which comprised thirty-eight books. This work was divided into unequal sections containing the history of Greece from its earliest days until the first Punic War. The Histories treated the history of Italy and Sicily in early times, of Sicily alone, and of Sicily and Greece together. The last five books address the time of Agathocles in detail; the work most likely concluded before the Romans crossed over into Sicily in 264. Timaeus also wrote a monograph on the Greek king Pyrrhus, which almost certainly had the wars against Rome as its centrepiece.

Timaeus devoted much attention to chronology and introduced the system of reckoning by Olympiads. In order to plot chronologies, he employed the years of Archons of Athens, of Ephors of Sparta, and of priestesses of Argos. This system, although not adopted in everyday life, was widely used by the Greek historians afterwards.

Timaeus can claim to be the first to recognize in his work the rising power of the Roman Republic, although it is not clear whether he regarded Rome as a potential friend or foe, and how he understood its significance for the history of the Mediterranean world as a whole. According to scholar Craige B. Champion, "Timaeus may well have been the first writer to see clearly the importance to the western Greeks of the victor of the great Sicilian War, whether it be Rome or Carthage, which he could not have divined."

Very few parts of the elaborate work of this historian were preserved after Antiquity:

- Some fragments of the 38th book of the Histories (the life of Agathocles);
- A reworking of the last part of his Histories, On Pyrrhus, treating the life of this king of Epirus until 264 BC;
- History of the cities and kings of Syria (unless the text of the Suda is corrupt);
- The chronological sketch (The victors at Olympia) perhaps formed an appendix to the larger work.

== Reception ==
Timaeus was highly criticized by other historians, especially by Polybius, and indeed his unfairness towards his predecessors, which gained him the nickname of Epitimaeus (Ἐπιτίμαιος, 'fault-finder'), laid him open to retaliation. While Polybius was well-versed in military matters and a statesman, Timaeus is depicted as a bookworm without military experience or personal knowledge of the places he described. The most serious charge against him was that he willfully distorted the truth when influenced by personal considerations: thus, he was less than fair to Dionysius I of Syracuse and Agathocles, while loud in praise of his favourite Timoleon.

On the other hand, as even Polybius admitted, Timaeus consulted all available authorities and records. His attitude towards the myths, which he claimed to have preserved in their simple form, can be contrasted to the rationalistic interpretation under which it had become the fashion to disguise them. This is probably the origin of his nickname graosyllektria (γραοσυλλεκτρία; "Old Ragwoman", or "collector of old wives' tales"), an allusion to his fondness for trivial details.

Both Dionysius of Halicarnassus and the Pseudo-Longinus characterized him as a model of "frigidity", although the latter admitted that he was nevertheless a competent writer. Cicero, who was a diligent reader of Timaeus, expressed a far more favourable opinion, especially commending his copiousness of matter and variety of expression. Timaeus was one of the chief authorities used by Gnaeus Pompeius Trogus, by Diodorus Siculus, and by Plutarch (in his life of Timoleon).

== See also ==
- Timaeus of Locri

== Notes ==
=== Bibliography ===
- Baron, Christopher A. (2013). Timaeus of Tauromenium and Hellenistic Historiography. Cambridge University Press. ISBN 978-1-107-00097-1.
- Brown, Truesdell S. (1958). Timaeus of Tauromenium. Berkeley: University of California Press.
- Champion, Craige B. (2012). "Timaeus of Tauromenium". In Bagnall, Roger S; Brodersen, Kai; Champion, Craige B; Erskine, Andrew (eds.). The Encyclopedia of Ancient History. John Wiley & Sons. doi:10.1002/9781444338386.wbeah08159. ISBN 978-1-4443-3838-6.
- Meister, Klaus (1970). "Das Exil des Timaios von Tauromenion". Kokalos. 16: 53–59.
- Meister, Klaus (1989). "The role of Timaeus in Greek historiography". Scripta Classica Israelica. 10: 55–65. doi:10.71043/sci.v10i.4617.
- Momigliano, Arnaldo (1977). "Athens in the Third Century BC and the Discovery of Rome in the Histories of Timaeus of Tauromenium". Essays in Ancient and Modern Historiograph. Blackwell. pp. 37–66. ISBN 978-0-608-02319-9.
- Pearson, Lionel I. C. (1987). The Greek Historians of the West: Timaeus and His Predecessors. American Philological Association. ISBN 978-1-55540-151-1.
- Walbank, Frank W. (1968). "The historians of Greek Sicily". Kokalos. 14/15: 476–497.
