= Tryphé =

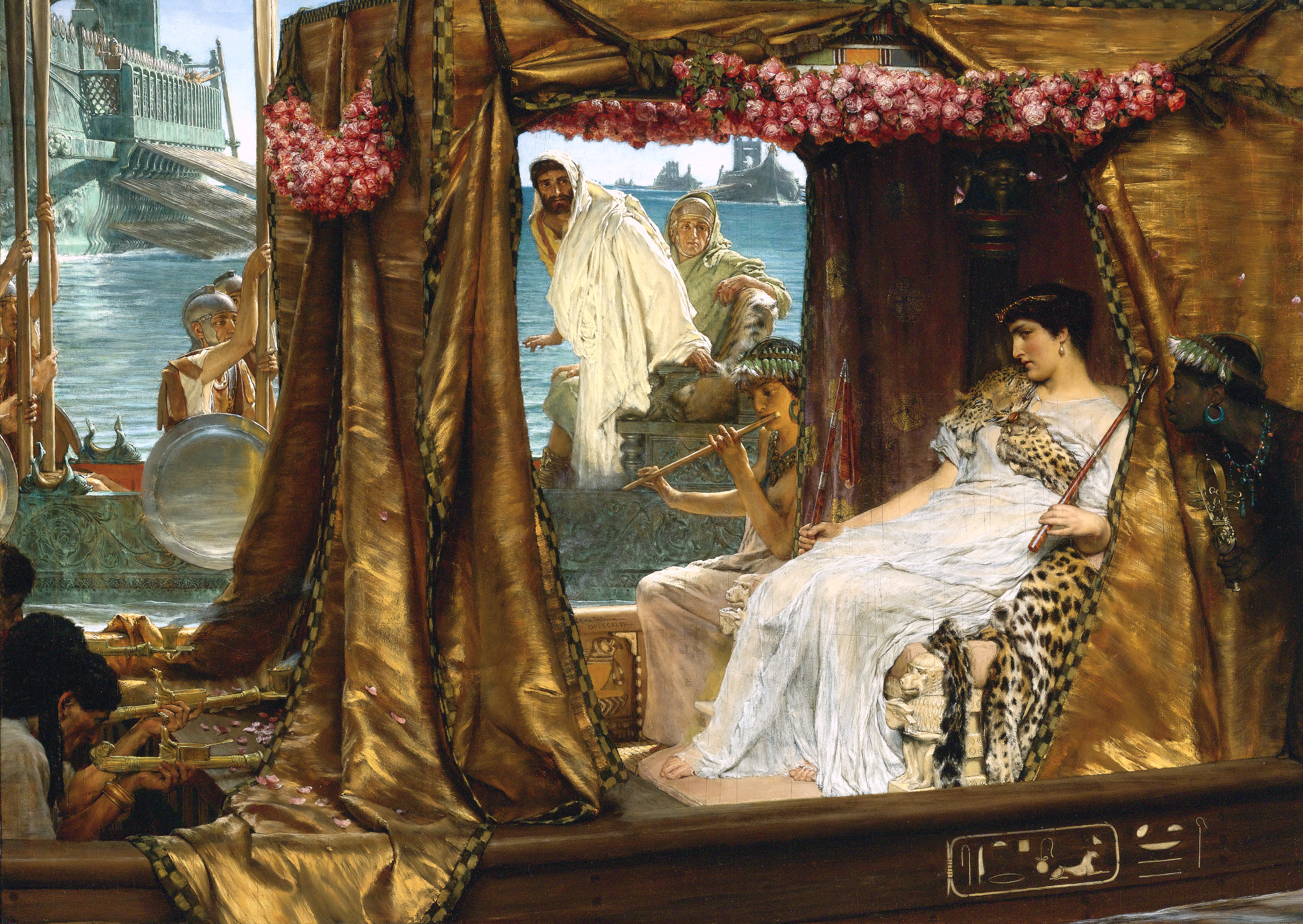
Antony and Cleopatra, by Lawrence Alma-Tadema. Noted by Plutarch, and dramatized by Shakespeare, Cleopatra's encounter with Marc Antony at the Nile epitomized tryphé: it upstaged Antony's procession in a greater display of wealth and finery, it provided an exciting spectacle for subjects gathering for the event, and it showcased the kind of gauzy femininity that led many Romans to consider tryphé a sign of effeminacy and weakness when, if anything, it camouflaged unbridled power.

Tryphé (Greek: τρυφή) – variously glossed as "softness", "voluptuousness", "magnificence" and "extravagance", none fully adequate – is a concept that drew attention (and severe criticism) in Roman antiquity when it became a significant factor in the reign of the Ptolemaic dynasty. Classical authors such as Aeschines and Plutarch condemned the tryphé of Romans such as Crassus and Lucullus, which included lavish dinner parties and ostentatious buildings. But there was more to Ptolemaic tryphé than dissipative excess, which after all can be pursued in residential or geographical seclusion, and for purely private purposes. It was a component of a calculated political strategy, in that it deployed not just conspicuous consumption but also conspicuous magnificence, beneficence and feminine delicacy, as a self-reinforcing cluster of signal propaganda concepts in the Ptolemaic dynasty.

== Bibliography ==
- Berno, Francesca Romana (2023). Roman Luxuria: a Literary and Cultural History (First ed.). Oxford, United Kingdom: Oxford University Press. ISBN 9780192846402.
