= Aresas =

5th-century BC Greek philosopher

Aresas (Ancient Greek: Ἀρέσας) (Note: Catalogued as Oresas, perhaps erroneously, in some modern sources.) of Lucania, and probably of Croton in Magna Graecia, was the head of the Pythagorean school, and the sixth head of the school in succession from Pythagoras himself. Diodorus of Aspendus was one of his students. He lived around the 4th or 5th century BCE.

At some point Aresas had to flee Croton, from people hostile to Pythagoreanism. He may have been the last head of the school in an unbroken line from Pythagoras; on the other hand Neoplatonist philosopher Iamblichus mentions Aresas as having "re-established" the school, implying a direct lineage might have been broken.

Some attribute to Aresas a work "about Human Nature," of which a fragment is preserved by Stobaeus; but others suppose it to have been written by the Pythagorean philosopher Aesara.

Some sources conflate Aresas with an "Aresandrus of Lucania", though this "Aresandrus" is otherwise unknown, and modern scholars consider this an error.
