= Telauges =

Ancient Greek philosopher, son or student of Pythagoras

Telauges (Greek: Τηλαύγης; fl. c. 500 BC) was a Samian Pythagorean philosopher and, according to tradition, the son of Pythagoras and Theano. Little is known about his life and works other than a scattering of remarks from much later writers.

== Life ==
Little is known about the life of Telauges. According to tradition, he was the son of Pythagoras and Theano. Iamblichus claims that Pythagoras died when Telauges was very young, and that Telauges eventually married Bitale the daughter of Damo, his sister. It was said that Telauges was a teacher of Empedocles, perhaps in an attempt to link Empedocles to Pythagoras.

== Works ==
Diogenes Laërtius says that Telauges wrote nothing, but then makes use of a supposed letter from Telauges to Philolaus for some information concerning Empedocles. Iamblichus claims that a work of Pythagoras concerning the gods was said by some to have been composed by Telauges, using the notes which Pythagoras bequeathed to Damo. The Suda claims that Telauges wrote four books on the tetractys. Marcus Aurelius, in his Meditations, contrasts Telauges with Socrates.
