= Damo (philosopher) =

Ancient Greek pythagorean philosopher

- Born: c. 535 BCE; Croton, Italy
- Died: c. 475 BCE; Athens, Greece
- Spouse: Meno the Crotonian

Philosophical work
- Era: Pre-Socratic philosophy
- Region: Western philosophy
- School: Pythagoreanism

Damo (/ˈdeɪmoʊ/; Ancient Greek: Δαμώ; fl. c. 500 BC) was a Pythagorean philosopher said by many to have been the daughter of Pythagoras and Theano.

== Early life ==
Tradition relates that she was born in Croton, Magna Graecia, and was the daughter of Pythagoras and Theano. According to Iamblichus, Damo married Meno the Crotonian. Some accounts refer to her as an only daughter, while others indicate that she had two sisters, Arignote and Myia (married to Milo of Croton). With her brother Telauges, they became members of the Pythagorean sect founded by their father.

== Writing ==
References to Damo can be found in the works of Diogenes Laërtius, Athenaeus and Iamblichus, although little is known about her life. As the sect credited Pythagoras with authorship for members' work, it is likely that Damo contributed to the doctrines ascribed to the philosopher. According to one story, Pythagoras bequeathed his writings to Damo, and she kept them safe, refusing to sell them, believing that poverty and her father's solemn injunctions were more precious than gold. Damo, in turn, passed the writings (memoranda hypomnemata) on to her daughter Bitale and Telauges, and to her mother's brother. The writings, as well as those by Damo herself, are not known to have survived. According to Iamblichus, she was a sister of Telauges.
