= Statilius Attalus =

2nd-century Roman physician

Statilius Attalus was a physician of ancient Rome in the second century. He was the court physician, or Archiater, of the Roman emperors Marcus Aurelius and Lucius Verus.

He was a pupil of the Greek physician Soranus of Ephesus, and belonged to the Methodic school, but spent most of his career in Rome. He is mentioned by the medical annalist Galen as having misdiagnosed the disease of which the Cynic philosopher Theagenes of Patras died.
