= Tisia =

Scientific classification
- Kingdom: Animalia
- Phylum: Arthropoda
- Clade: Pancrustacea
- Class: Insecta
- Order: Hemiptera
- Suborder: Heteroptera
- Family: Pentatomidae
- Genus: Tisia; Hoberlandt, 1993
- Species: T. esfandiarii

Binomial name
- Tisia esfandiarii Dlabola, 1981

Genus of shield bugs

Tisia is a monotypic genus of shield bugs in the tribe Sciocorini, erected by Hoberlandt in 1993. It contains the species Tisia esfandiarii.
