= Agathobulus =

2nd century Greek Cynic philosopher

Agathobulus (Greek: Ἀγαθόβουλος Agathoboulos; fl. 2nd century) of Alexandria, who lived c. 125 AD, was a Cynic philosopher and teacher of Demonax and Peregrinus Proteus.

Little is known about his life. He is listed in the Chronicle of Jerome as flourishing in the 224th Olympiad (117 to 121 CE): "Plutarch of Chaeronea, Sextus, Agathobulus and Oenomaus are considered notable philosophers."

According to Lucian, he was the teacher of Demonax; and Peregrinus Proteus studied the Cynic way of life in Alexandria under his tutelage:

Thereafter Peregrinus went away a third time, to Egypt, to visit Agathobulus, where he took that wonderful course of training in asceticism, shaving one half of his head, daubing his face with mud, and demonstrating what they call 'indifference' by erecting his shameful thing (aidoion) amid a thronging mob of bystanders, besides giving and taking blows on the rump with a rod, and playing the charlatan even more audaciously in many other ways.
