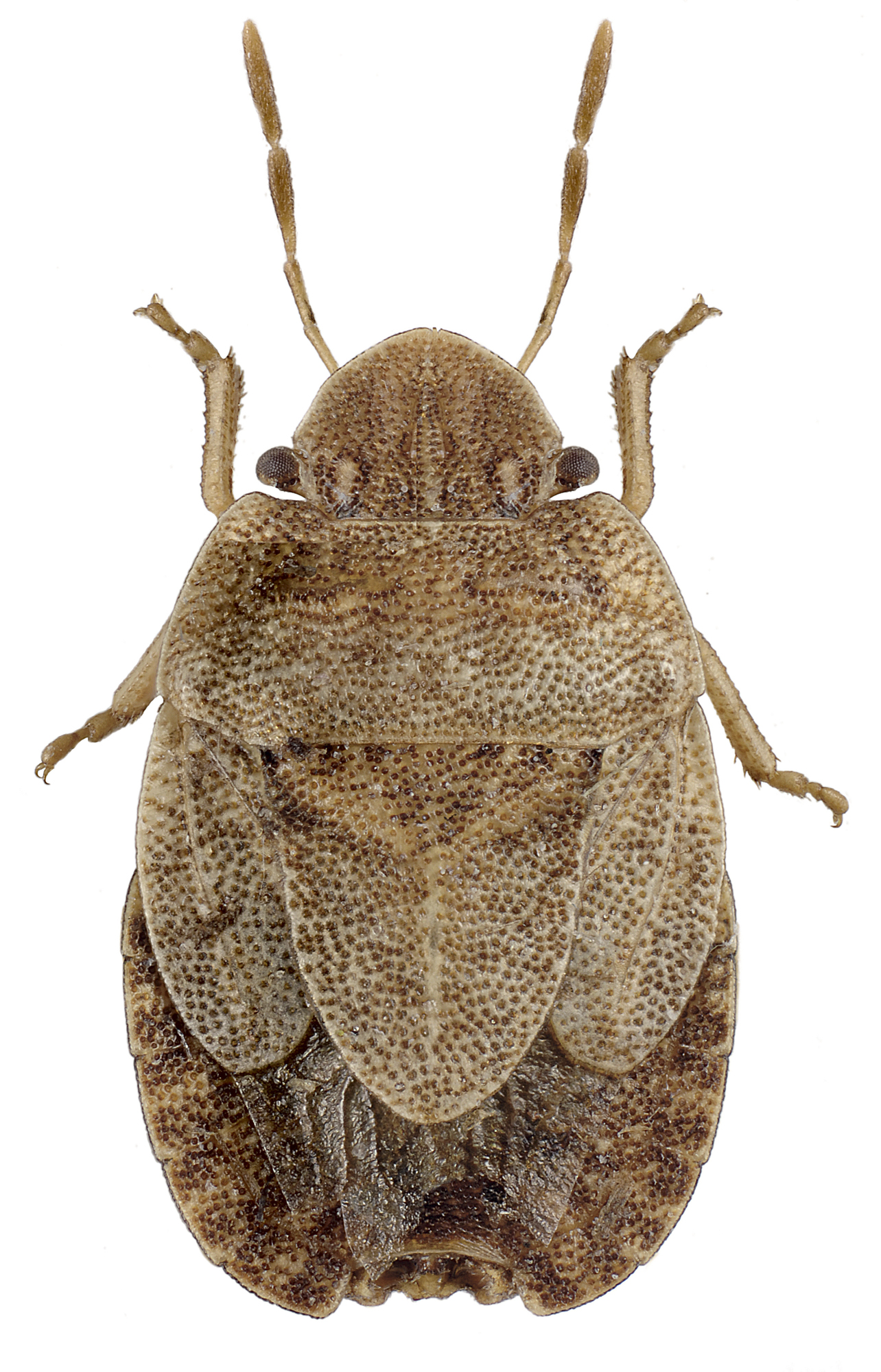
- Sciocoris microphthalmus

Scientific classification
- Domain: Eukaryota
- Kingdom: Animalia
- Phylum: Arthropoda
- Class: Insecta
- Order: Hemiptera
- Suborder: Heteroptera
- Family: Pentatomidae
- Subfamily: Pentatominae
- Tribe: Sciocorini; Amyot & Serville, 1843

= Sciocorini =

Tribe of true bugs

Sciocorini is a tribe of stink bugs in the family Pentatomidae.

== Genera ==
The following are included in BioLib.cz:

1. Adelaidena Distant, 1910
2. Decellela Schouteden, 1964
3. Dyroderes Spinola, 1837
4. Eupododus Kirkaldy, 1904
5. Kapunda Distant, 1911
6. Menaccarus Amyot & Serville, 1843
7. Menedemus Distant, 1899
8. Phaeocoris Jakovlev, 1887
9. Psammotisia Kment, 2006
10. Sciocoris Fallén, 1829
11. Tisia Hoberlandt, 1993
12. Trincavellius Distant, 1900
