= Phintys =

Ancient Greek philosopher

Phintys was a Pythagorean philosopher, probably from the third century BC. She wrote a work on the correct behaviour of women, two extracts of which are preserved by Stobaeus.

According to Stobaeus, Phintys was the daughter of Callicrates, who is otherwise unknown. Holger Thesleff suggests that this Callicrates might be identified with Callicratidas, a Spartan general who died at the Battle of Arginusae. If so, this would make Phintys a Spartan, and date her birth to the late fifth century BC, and her floruit to the fourth century. I. M. Plant considers this emendation "fanciful". Iamblichus mentions Philtys in his list of female Pythagoreans; he says that she was from Croton and that her father was called Theophrius. I. M. Plant believes that Iamblichus' Philtys, though also a Pythagorean and similarly named, is distinct from Stobaeus' Phintys.

Two fragments attributed to Phintys are preserved in Stobaeus. However, not all scholars agree that the fragments are authentic: Lefkowitz and Fant argue that the works attributed to female Pythagoreans, including Phintys, were actually rhetorical exercises written by men. They are written in the Doric dialect, and amount to about 80 lines of prose. The language used dates to around the fourth century BC, although some features of it appear to be deliberate archaisms; it was likely actually composed in the third century BC, though a date as late as the second century AD was suggested by Friedrich Wilhelm in 1915.

The fragments discuss the differences between men and women, and argue for chastity as the most important virtue for women. Phintys gives a series of ways that women ought to practice self-control, concluding that the most effective way is to only have sex with her husband in order to produce legitimate children. Along with her defence of women's chastity, she argues that the practice of philosophy is appropriate for women as well as men.
