= Friedrich Wilhelm August Mullach =

German scholar (1807–1882)

Friedrich Wilhelm August Mullach (Latin: Fridericus Guilelmus Augustus Mullachius; 1807–1882) was a German philologist and Byzantine scholar.

== Life ==
He was born on January 1, 1807, in Berlin. He taught history and philology at Berlin University. He died on June 8, 1882, in Berlin.

== Legacy ==
His Fragments of the Greek Philosophers was the first comprehensive collection of the Pre-Socratics. His Grammar of the Greek Vernacular was the standard late 19th-century work on the development of modern Greek. However, Nietzsche, who argued that Democritus's legitimate works should be limited to The Great Diacosmos and On the Nature of the Cosmos, the only two considered genuine by the Byzantine Suda, felt Mullach was "a negligent blockhead".

== Works ==
Mullach is best remembered for his Fragmenta Philosophorum Graecorum (Fragments of the Greek Philosophers), published by the Didots at Paris between 1860 and 1881.

He also wrote or edited:

- Quaestionum Democritearum specimen, Berlin, 1835. (in Latin)
- Demetrii Zeni Paraphrasis Batrachomyomachiae vulgari Graecorum sermone scripta, Berlin, 1837. (in Latin)
- Grammaire latine à l'usage des classes inférieures et moyennes du Collège Royal Français, Berlin, 1841. (in French)
- Quaestionum Democritearum specimen secundum, Berlin, 1842. (in Latin)
- Democriti Abderitae operum fragment, Berlin, 1843; 2nd ed., 1860. (in Latin)
- Aristotelis de Melisso, Xenophane et Gorgia disputationes, Berlin, 1845. (in Latin)
- Disputatio de Empedoclis prooemio, Berlin, 1850. (in Latin)
- Coniectaneorum Byzantinorum libri duo, Berlin, 1852. (in Latin)
- Hieroclis in aureum Pythagoreorum carmen commentarius, Berlin, 1853. (in Latin)
- Quaestionum Empedoclearum specimen secundum, Berlin, 1853. (in Latin)
- Grammatik der griechischen Vulgarsprache in historischer Entwicklung [Grammar of the Greek Vernacular in Its Historical Development], Berlin, 1856. (in German) & (in Greek)
