= Neanthes of Cyzicus =

4th/3rd-century BC Greek historian

Neanthes of Cyzicus (/niˈænθiːz/; Greek: Νεάνθης ὁ Κυζικηνός) was a Greek historian and rhetorician of Cyzicus in Anatolia living in the fourth and third centuries BC.

== Biography ==
Neanthes was a pupil of Philiscus of Miletus ("who is reasonably certain to have died before 300 BC"). Philiscus himself had been a pupil of Isocrates. In an honorary decree of 287 BC, the people of Delphi award him the proxeny, and this is the earliest of "only five decrees from the third century honoring historians, teachers of grammar or literature, or philosophers for their educational activities in the cities' gymnasia."

Neanthes was a voluminous writer, principally of history, but very little has reached us to form any judgement of his merits. The various authors that quote him seem, with rare exceptions, to place great reliance on his accuracy and judgement. He is frequently referred to by Diogenes Laërtius, Athenaeus, and by several of the early Christian writers, as well as by others. Among the writings of Neanthes there were:

1. Memoirs of king Attalus
2. Hellenica
3. Lives of illustrious men
4. Pythagorica
5. The myths about the city
6. On Purification
7. Annals

He probably wrote an account of Cyzicus, as we can infer from a passage in Strabo. He may also have written many panegyrical orations and a work Περὶ κακοζηλίας ῥητορικῆς or Περὶ ζηλοτυπίας against the Asiatic style of rhetoric. This latter work, as well as the history of Attalus I (who ruled 241–197), are irreconcilable with the dates of the Delphian decree and of Philiscus of Miletus; therefore, it is supposed that they are the work of a later Neanthes of the second century BC.
