= Ocellus Lucanus =

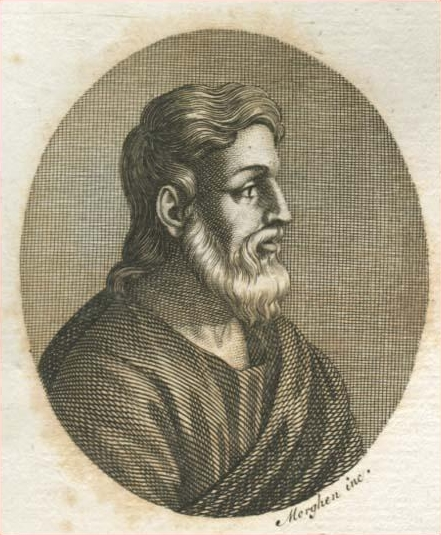
Ocellus Lucanus in a XIX century depiction

Ocellus Lucanus (Ancient Greek: Ὄκελλος) was allegedly a Pythagorean philosopher, born in Lucania in Magna Graecia in the 6th century BC. Aristoxenus cites him along with another Lucanian by the name of Ocillo, in a work preserved by Iamblichus that lists 218 supposed Pythagoreans, which nonetheless contained some inventions, wrong attributions to non-Pythagoreans, and some names derived from earlier pseudopythagoric traditions.

== Pseudo-Ocellus Lucanus ==
A pseudepigraphic work, "On the Nature of the Universe", was attributed to him, and the citation of its author nowadays appears as Pseudo-Ocellus Lucanus. In two apocryphal letters that Archytas allegedly sent to Plato, he mentioned that he had talked with the descendants of Ocellus and sent four Ocellus' books to him. Both letters appear to have been forged to authenticate the false treatise, which can be dated to around the 1st century BC. Stobaeus (Ecl. Phys. i. 13) has preserved a fragment of the supposed Περὶ νόμου in the Doric dialect, but the only one of his alleged works which is extant is a short treatise in four chapters in the Ionic dialect generally known as On the Nature of the Universe. Excerpts from this are given in Stobaeus (i. 20), but in Doric. It maintains the doctrine that the universe is uncreated and eternal:

"Every nature that has a progression possesses three boundaries and two intervals. The three boundaries are generation, height of being, and end of being; the intervals are progression from generation to height of being, and from height of being to the end of being. But the universe shows no indications of such boundaries and intervals, for we do not perceive it rising into existence, or becoming; nor growing better and greater; nor become less and worse. Rather, it always continues to persist in the same manner, and is perpetually equal and similar to itself."

Pseudo-Ocellus also asserts that the three great divisions of the universe correspond the three kinds of beings—gods, men and daemons; and, finally, that the human race with all its institutions (the family, marriage and the like) must be eternal. It advocates an ascetic mode of life, with a view to the perfect reproduction of the race and its training in all that is noble and beautiful.

Editions of the Περὶ τῆς τοῦ παντὸς φύσεως, by A. F. Rudolph (1801, with commentary), and by F. W. A. Mullach in Fragmenta philosophorum graecorum, i. (1860); see also Eduard Zeller, History of Greek Philosophy, i. (Eng. trans.), and J de Heyden-Zielewicz in Breslauer philologische Abhandlungen, viii. 3 (1901); and R. Harder, Ocellus Lucanus [Neue philologische Untersuchungen vol. 1. Berlin: Weidmann, 1926. There is an English translation (1831) by Thomas Taylor, the Platonist.
