= Philiscus of Miletus =

Philiscus of Miletus (in Greek: Φιλίσκος ο Μιλήσιος) was an ancient Greek rhetoric teacher in the 4th century BC and a student of Isocrates. Before his involvement in rhetoric, he was a renowned flutist ("most paradoxical") and for this reason, Isocrates called him "flute hole". Later, he founded his own school in Athens, where historians Timaeus of Tauromenium and Neanthes of Cyzicus were his pupils.

He wrote a manual on the art of rhetoric, consisting of two books, the biography of the Athenian orator and politician Lycurgus, and a collection of aphorisms and rhetorical examples from his teacher Isocrates. A funeral epigram of his for Lysias (from Pseudo-Plutarch) and an excerpt of some work on a papyrus from Oxyrhynchus have been preserved.

According to the unknown author of this papyrus (from the 2nd century AD), Philiscus wrote about the story of a child claimed by two different mothers, where the judge ordered the child to be cut in two, each mother to receive a piece. This excerpt, reminiscent of the biblical story of Solomon, sparked interesting comments. Some researchers claimed that the exact similarity of the two stories proves that Philiscus (and hence the Greeks of the 4th century BC) already knew the stories of the Bible. Others argued that this is not certain because the story of Philiscus, like the corresponding one in the Bible, could well originate from an older Indian source.
