= Cronius the Pythagorean =

Ancient Greek philosopher

Cronius (Greek: Κρόνιος; fl. 2nd century AD) was a celebrated Neopythagorean philosopher. He was probably a contemporary of Numenius of Apamea, who lived in the 2nd century, and he is often spoken of along with him. Nemesius mentions a work of his On Reincarnation, (Greek: περὶ παλιγγενεσίας), and Origen is said to have diligently studied the works of Cronius. Porphyry also states that he endeavoured to explain the fables of the Homeric poems in a philosophical manner. This is all we know about Cronius, although he appears to have been very distinguished among the Neopythagoreans.
