= Hestiaeus of Perinthus =

Student of Plato

Hestiaeus of Perinthus (Greek: Ἑστιαῖος Περίνθιος) was one of Plato's students.
