= Lionel I. C. Pearson =

British classical scholar

Lionel I. C. Pearson (30 January 1908 – 18 September 1988) was a British classical scholar. He is primarily known for his work Early Ionian Historians, in which he outlines the historical methods of Hecataeus of Miletus, Xanthus the Lydian, Charon of Lampsacus, and Hellanicus of Lesbos.

== Career ==
Lionel Ignatius Cusack Pearson was born in London on 30 January 1908, the son of Arthur Anselm and Ellen Cusack Pearson. He is a graduate of Trinity College, Oxford (B.A. 1930), and Yale University (PhD 1939). He taught Greek and classics at the University of Glasgow (1930–1931), Dalhousie University (1932–1938), Yale (1935–1936), and the New York State College of Teachers (1939–1940), then at Stanford University from 1940 to 1973 (except for a stint with the British Army Intelligence Corps between 1943 and 1946). Pearson was named a Guggenheim fellow in 1957–1958.

Pearson served as the president of the Philological Association of the Pacific Coast, and as the director and financial trustee of the APA (American Philosophical Association). He was the first chair of the APA Advisory Committee between 1973 and 1979.

He died on 18 September 1988 of pancreatic cancer Sunday, in a hospital in Menlo Park, California. His wife, Doris, was killed in a car accident in 1964. They had no children.
