= Peregrinus Proteus =

Greek Cynic philosopher (c. 95–165)

Peregrinus Proteus (Ancient Greek: Περεγρῖνος Πρωτεύς; c. 95 – 165 AD) was a Greek Cynic philosopher, from Parium in Mysia. Leaving home at a young age, he first lived with the Christians in Roman Palestine. After being expelled from that community he adopted the life of a Cynic philosopher and eventually settled in Greece. Peregrinus is most remembered for his suicide after giving his own funeral oration, cremating himself on a funeral pyre at the Olympic Games in 165. By 180 AD, a statue of Peregrinus had been erected in his home city of Parium; it was reputed to have oracular powers.

== Life ==
=== Lucian's satirical biography ===
The only detailed account of the life of Peregrinus was recorded by Lucian in his satire, The Death of Peregrinus (Latin: De Morte Peregrini). Although this account is hostile to Peregrinus, the bare facts of his life can be extracted.

Peregrinus was born in Parium, c. 95 AD. At a young age he was suspected of parricide, and was obliged to leave his native home. During his wanderings he reached Palestine, he came into close contact with the Christian community, and quickly rose to a position of authority. He suffered a term of imprisonment at the hands of the Roman authorities, during which the Christians gave him much aid. He may have expected to be martyred, but the Governor of Syria released him.

He seems to have become a Cynic at this point, because he returned home and renounced his inheritance, giving away all his money to the people of his home city. He resumed his wandering life, maintaining close relations with the Christians at first, but eventually he offended them in some way, and was expelled from the Christian community. He went to Egypt to study with the famous Cynic Agathobulus, where he learned the harsh asceticism of the sect. He made his way to Rome, where he began a campaign of abuse against the Roman authorities, and especially the emperor Antoninus Pius. He gained a following among the masses, and it may be at this point that Theagenes became his chief disciple. Although tolerated at first, he was eventually expelled by the City Prefect.

He next went to Elis in Greece, where he continued his anti-Roman preaching. At the Olympic games (either 153 or 157), Peregrinus abused the wealthy philanthropist Herodes Atticus, whereby the infuriated crowd attacked Peregrinus, and he was forced to take refuge at the altar of Zeus. In Athens, Peregrinus devoted himself to the study and teaching of philosophy, and obtained a considerable number of pupils, amongst them Aulus Gellius. At the Olympic Games of 161, he announced that he would publicly burn himself to death at the following Olympics:

He said that he wanted to put a tip of gold on a golden life; for one who had lived as Heracles should die like Heracles and be commingled with the aether. And I wish, said he, to benefit mankind by showing them the way in which one should disregard death; wherefore all men ought to play Philoctetes to my Heracles.

He carried out his promise: on the final night of the Olympic games in 165, he immolated himself on a funeral pyre located 20 stadia (3.7 km) east of Olympia. Lucian, who was present, witnessed the event, having heard Theagenes, Peregrinus' most ardent disciple, praise his master's intentions.

It is hard to reconstruct Peregrinus' own motivations for the events of his life, because Lucian, for general and personal reasons, presents a hostile view of Peregrinus. According to Lucian, Peregrinus strangled his father to death; became a Christian so that he could gain wealth; was imprisoned so that he could gain notoriety; gave his inheritance away so that he might gain favour among the people of his home town; studied under Agathobulus so that he could become more obscene; attacked the Romans to become famous; and killed himself to become infamous.

=== Gellius's account ===
Aulus Gellius provides a brief, but different, view of Peregrinus, whom he describes as "a man of dignity and fortitude". Gellius regularly visited the philosopher's hut outside Athens to hear "helpful and noble" discourses:

He used to say that a wise man would not commit a sin, even if he knew that neither gods nor men would know it; for he thought that one ought to refrain from sin, not through fear of punishment or disgrace, but from love of justice and honesty and from a sense of duty.

=== Ammianus Marcellinus's allusion ===
Ammianus Marcellinus also makes a brief, positive reference to Peregrinus, who is likened to the 4th century philosopher Simonides, burnt alive in the reign of the Emperor Valens:

Simonides, ... to whom death was an escape from the grim tyrant life, and who laughed at sudden disastrous turns of fate, stood unmoved amid the flames, like the famous philosopher Peregrinus, nicknamed Proteus. He, having decided to leave the world, mounted a pyre which he had built himself at the quinquennial Olympic games, and was consumed by fire while the whole of Greece looked on.

=== Modern reconstructions ===
Several modern historians have attempted to outline Peregrinus' life using the works of Lucian and other sources that have fixed historical dates such as the completion of Herodes Atticus's aqueduct and the Jewish revolt in Judea. One of the more complete timelines of Peregrinus Proteus' life comes from Gilbert Bagnani. He suggests the following timeline for Peregrinus' life:

- ca. 95 birth at Parium
- 114–116 in Armenia
- ca. 120 at Parium: death of his father
- 120–130 goes to Palestine and Syria: joins Essene-Ebionite Church at Pella
- 132 imprisoned on the outbreak of the Jewish revolt
- 134 released by Julius Severus
- 135 after his return to Parium resumes his travels
- ca. 140 excommunicated as an Ebionite: goes to Egypt
- ca. 150 goes to Rome
- ca. 152 expelled from Rome
- 153 attacks Herodes Atticus at Olympia
- 157 is reconciled to Herodes
- 165 his death at Olympia.

== See also ==
- Kalanos
- Zarmanochegas
