= Diodorus of Aspendos =

4th century BC Pythagorean philosopher

Diodorus of Aspendos (Ancient Greek: Διόδωρος ὁ Ἀσπένδιος) was a 4th-century BC Pythagorean philosopher, who probably lived after the time of Plato, and must have been still alive in 104th Olympiad, for he was an acquaintance of Stratonicus the musician, who lived at the court of Ptolemy Lagi. According to Iamblichus, He was the student or companion of the Pythagorean philosopher Aresas. Diodorus is said to have rejected the Pythagorean lifestyle and let his beard grow out, adopting something more similar to the Cynic mode of living prior to its endorsement by Diogenes.
