= Anaxilaus =

Greek physician and Pythagorean philosopher

Anaxilaus or Anaxilas of Larissa (Ancient Greek: Ἀναξίλαος, Ἀναξίλας; fl. 1st century BC) was a physician and Pythagorean philosopher. According to Eusebius, he was banished from Rome in 28 BC by Augustus on the charge of practicing magic. Anaxilaus wrote about the "magical" properties of minerals, herbs, and other substances and derived drugs, and is cited by Pliny in this regard. His exceptional knowledge of natural science allowed him to produce tricks that were mistaken for magic.
