= Brontinus =

Pythagorean philosopher

Brontinus of Metapontum (Greek: Βροντῖνος, also Brotinus, Βροτῖνος; fl. 6th century BCE), Magna Graecia, was a Pythagorean philosopher and a friend and disciple of Pythagoras. Alcmaeon dedicated his works to Brontinus as well as to Leon and Bathyllus. Accounts vary as to whether he was the father or the husband of Theano.

Some Orphic poems were ascribed to Brontinus. One was a poem On Nature (Physika), another was a poem called The Robe and the Net that was also ascribed to Zopyrus of Heraclea.

His fame was sufficient for a spurious work to be ascribed to him in the Neopythagorean literature. Syrianus (5th century CE) refers to "Brotinus" as an author of the view that the monad, or first cause, "transcends all kinds of reason and essence in power and dignity," whereby an attempt was made to insert an element of Platonism into Pythagoreanism, which probably refers to Neoplatonism.

== See also ==
- Hippasus of Metapontum
