= Zenodotus (philosopher) =

5th century Neoplatonist philosopher

Zenodotus (/zəˈnɒdətəs/; Greek: Ζηνόδοτος; fl. late 5th century AD) was a Neoplatonic philosopher who lived and taught in Athens. He was described as "the darling of Proclus." Zenodotus served under Marinus of Neapolis when Marinus succeeded Proclus as the head (scholarch) of the school (c. 485). He was a teacher of Damascius when he came to Athens to learn philosophy (c. 492). Whereas Marinus taught mathematics and scientific courses to Damascius, Zenodotus taught the more conventional philosophy courses. He was an important philosopher in Athens during the time when Marinus and Hegias were contending for the leadership of the school, but he seems to have been overlooked as a possible scholarch on more than one occasion.
