= Theagenes of Patras =

2nd century Greek Cynic philosopher

Theagenes (Greek: Θεαγένης; fl. c. 160 AD) of Patras, was a Cynic philosopher and close friend of Peregrinus Proteus.

He is known principally as a character who appears in Lucian's The Death of Peregrinus (Latin: De Morte Peregrini), where he is introduced as praising Peregrinus' desire to kill himself by self-immolation:

Proteus," he cried, "Proteus vain-glorious? Who dares name the word? Earth! Sun! Seas! Rivers! God of our fathers, Heracles! Was it for this that he suffered bondage in Syria? that he forgave his country a debt of a million odd? that he was cast out of Rome, — he whose brilliance exceeds the Sun, fit rival of the Lord of Olympus? 'Tis his good will to depart from life by fire, and they call it vain-glory! What other end had eracles?

Theagenes aided Peregrinus by setting fire to the funeral pyre, which Peregrinus threw himself upon. Theagenes compared Peregrinus' suicide with the similar practices of the Gymnosophists in India. Lucian, who was hostile to Theagenes and his brand of Cynicism, states that Theagenes had a fortune of fifteen talents, which he obtained by money-lending.

Theagenes is also mentioned by Galen, who recalls how he lectured daily to large crowds in Trajan's Forum in Rome. Galen describes how Theagenes died when he was given an inappropriate treatment by Statilius Attalus (physician to Marcus Aurelius) for inflammation of the liver.
