= Calliphon =

Ancient Greek philosopher

Calliphon (or Callipho, Koine Greek: Καλλιφῶν) was a Greek philosopher, who probably belonged to the Peripatetic school and lived in the 2nd century BCE. He is mentioned several times and condemned by Cicero as making the chief good of man to consist in a union of virtue (Latin: honestas) and bodily pleasure (Ancient Greek: ἡδονή, Latin: voluptas), or, as Cicero says, in the union of the human with the beast.
