= Aesara =

Ancient Greek philosopher

Aesara of Lucania (Greek: Αἰσάρα, Aisara) (fl. 400BC - 300BC) was a Pythagorean philosopher and attested author of On Human Nature, a fragment of which is preserved by Stobaeus. The authorship has been contested, most notably by Holger Thesleff in a critical note to the Greek text. Thesleff suggests that the attribution by Stobaeus to Aesara (a feminine name) is an emendation error in the manuscript. He attributes it instead to Aresas, a male writer from Lucania who is also mentioned by Iamblichus in his Life of Pythagoras.

== On Human Nature ==
The following is excerpted from the extant fragment of Aesara's On Human Nature:

Human nature seems to me to provide a standard of law and justice both for the home and for the city. By following the tracks within himself whoever seeks will make a discovery: law is in him and justice, which is the orderly arrangement of the soul. Being threefold, it is organized in accordance with triple functions: that which effects thoughtfulness is [the mind], that which effects strength and ability is [high spirit], and all that effects love and kindliness is desire. These are all so disposed relatively to one another, that the best part is in command, the most inferior is governed, and the one in between holds a middle place; it both governs and is governed.

The writing asserts that the soul had three parts: the mind, the spirit, and desire. These three forces work in harmony, interacting in different ways for the achievement of different tasks.
