= Alexicrates =

1st-century Pythagorean philosopher

Alexicrates (Ancient Greek: Ἀλεξικράτης) was a Pythagorean philosopher who lived at the time of Plutarch (that is, around the turn of the 1st century AD), and whose disciples continued to observe the ancient diet of the Pythagoreans, abstaining from fish altogether. Another person of this name occurs in Plutarch.
