= Aeschines (physician) =

Ancient Greek physician

Aeschines (Ancient Greek: Αἰσχίνης) was a Greek ancient physician who lived in the latter half of the 4th century AD. He was born on the island of Chios, and settled at Athens, where he appears to have practiced with little success, but acquired fame by a cure of Eunapius Sardianus, who on his voyage to Athens had been seized with a fever, which yielded only to treatment of a peculiar nature.

Another Athenian physician of this name is quoted by Pliny, of whom it is only known that he must have lived some time before the middle of the 1st century AD.
