= Onatas (philosopher) =

5th century BCE Pythagorean philosopher

- Ὀνάτας
- Born: c. 5th century BCE; Croton or Tarentum

Philosophical work
- Era: Ancient philosophy
- Region: Ancient Greek philosophy
- School: Pythagoreanism

Onatas (Ancient Greek: Ὀνάτας) was a Pythagorean philosopher who lived in or around the 5th century BC, possibly in either Croton or Tarentum in Magna Graecia. Nothing more is known about his life, but he is credited by Stobaeus as the author of a pseudonymous Neo-Pythagorean work from the 1st century BC or AD entitled On God and the Divine (Ancient Greek: Περὶ θεοῦ καὶ θείου), which Stobaeus excerpts a long passage from. The author of the passage ("Pseudo-Onatas") argues against the belief in a single deity, on the basis that the universe itself is not God but only divine, but that God is a governing part of the universe. He argues that since there are many "powers" in the universe, therefore they must belong to different gods. Pseudo-Onatas also claimed that the earthy mixture of the body defiles the purity of the soul.
