= Sextus of Chaeronea =

Greek philosopher and teacher (c. 95 - c. 185)

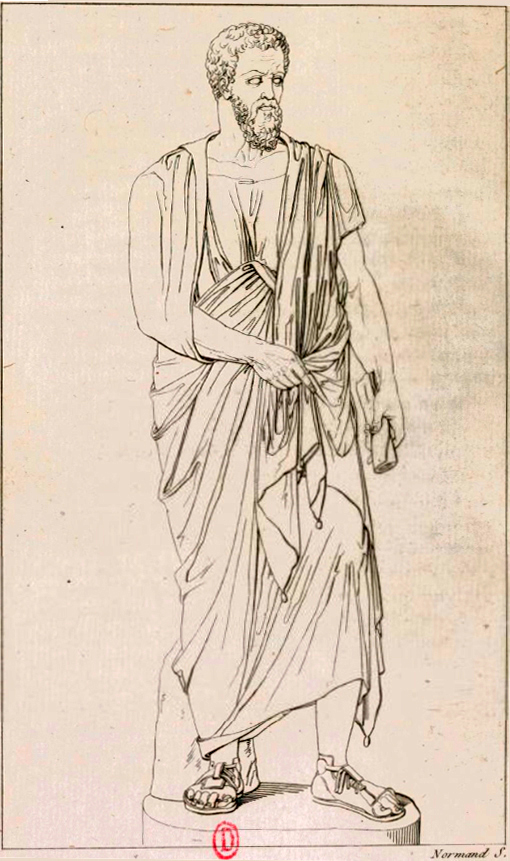
- Engraving of a statue of Sextus of Chaeronea, 1803.
- Born: c. 95; Chaeronea, Greece
- Died: c. 185 possibly Rome

Philosophical work
- Era: Hellenistic philosophy
- Region: Western philosophy
- Main interests: Epistemology, ethics

Sextus of Chaeronea (Ancient Greek: Σέξτος ὁ Χαιρωνεύς Sextos ho Chaironeus; c. 95 – c. 185) was a philosopher, a nephew or grandson of Plutarch, and one of the teachers of the emperor Marcus Aurelius.

== Biography ==
The Suda (a 10th-century Byzantine encyclopedia based on many ancient sources that have since been lost) identifies Sextus of Chaeronea as being a student of Herodotus of Tarsus and being the same person as Sextus Empiricus, in which case Sextus would be a Pyrrhonist. Diogenes Laertius also says that Sextus Empiricus was a student of Herodotus. A c. 1549 Latin translation of Outlines of Pyrrhonism ascribe them to Sextus of Chaeronea.

Some historians infer that due to his relationship with Plutarch that Sextus was a Platonist. Others infer that Sextus was a Stoic due to an ambiguous mention of Sextus as one of the teachers of Marcus Aurelius in the notably historically unreliable Historia Augusta.

The Suda also says that Sextus of Chaeronea was so high in the favour of Marcus Aurelius that he sat in judgment with him. Two works are mentioned, Ethics (Greek: Ἠθικά Ēthiká) and Inquiries (Greek: Ἐπισκεπτικά Episkeptiká), but whether they were by Sextus of Chaeronea or Sextus Empiricus is unknown.

Philostratus describes how even when Marcus was an old man, in the latter part of his reign, he received instruction from Sextus, who was teaching in Rome:

The Emperor Marcus was an eager disciple of Sextus the Boeotian philosopher, being often in his company and frequenting his house. Lucius, who had just come to Rome, asked the Emperor, whom he met on his way, where he was going to and on what errand, and Marcus answered: "It is good even for an old man to learn; I am now on my way to Sextus the philosopher to learn what I do not yet know." And Lucius, raising his hand to heaven, said, "O Zeus, the king of the Romans in his old age takes up his tablets and goes to school!"

The date of this encounter is most likely 177–8, before Marcus's last departure for war. Marcus is also said to have "show[n] off" his philosophy before Sextus.

Philostratus also recorded this comment from Sextus who counseled Herodes Atticus with regard to his grief for the death of his daughter Elpinice: "No small gift will you give your daughter if you control your grief for her."

In his Meditations, Marcus speaks of Sextus in glowing terms, and we discover the type of education he received from Sextus:

My debts to Sextus include kindliness, how to rule a household with paternal authority, the real meaning of the Natural Life, an unselfconscious dignity, an intuitive concern for the interests of one's friends, and a good-natured patience with amateurs and visionaries. The aptness of his courtesy to each individual lent a charm to his society more potent than any flattery, yet at the same time it exacted the complete respect of all present. His manner, too, of determining and systematizing the essential rules of life was as comprehensive as it was methodical. Never displaying a sign of anger nor any kind of emotion, he was at once entirely imperturbable and yet full of kindly affection. His approval was always quietly and undemonstratively expressed, and he never paraded his encyclopaedic learning.

Apuleius pays tribute to Sextus and Plutarch at the beginning of The Golden Ass. Sextus and Plutarch are mentioned by his descendant, Nicagoras of Athens (c. 180 – c. 250), on an inscription and in an lament by Nicagoras's descendant Himerius for his young son's death.

What hopes I had for you! To what bad luck my [evil] spirit has condemned me! I now lament the person who I hoped would speak more forcefully than Minucianus, more solemnly than Nicagoras, more eloquently than Plutarch, more philosophically than Musonius, more intrepidly than Sextus—in a word, more brilliantly and better than all of his ancestors.

He is likely the Sextus listed in the Chronicle of Jerome as flourishing in the 224th Olympiad (117 to 121): "Plutarch of Chaeronea, Sextus, Agathobulus and Oenomaus are considered notable philosophers." The Chronography of George Synkellos has a similar mention of Sextus associated with events from 109 to 120 "In old age the philosopher Plutarch of Chaeronea was appointed by the Emperor as procurator of Greece. The philosopher Sextus, as well as Agathobulus and Oenomaus were becoming known." George Synkellos mentions Sextus again as flourishing in the period of 165 to 171, "Sextus, the nephew of the philosopher Plutarch of Chaeronea" suggesting that Sextus became known at a young age (perhaps age 25 in 120) and flourished in old age (perhaps age 70 in 165).
