= Lyco of Iasos =

Lyco (or Lycon, Greek: Λύκων, but also called Lycus; 4th century BCE) of Iasos, in Caria, was a Pythagorean philosopher. He wrote a polemical attack on Aristotle's lavish lifestyle, and so probably lived in the second half of the 4th century BCE. He wrote a work On the Pythagorean Life, in which he emphasized, among other things, Pythagoras' "temperate way of life."
