= Diocles of Cnidus =

Greek philosopher

Diocles of Cnidus (Greek: Διοκλῆς) was an academic skeptic philosopher, who is mentioned as the author of Διατριβαί (Discussions) from which a fragment is quoted by Eusebius:

Diocles of Cnidos asserts in his Diatribae, that through fear of the followers of Theodorus the Atheist, and of the Sophist Bion, who used to assail the philosophers, and shrank from no means of refuting them, Arcesilaus took precautions, in order to avoid trouble, by never appearing to suggest any dogma, but used to put forward the epoche (suspense of judgement) as a protection, like the black juice which the cuttlefishes throw out.
