= Ammonius of Athens =

1st century AD Greek philosopher

Ammonius of Athens (/əˈmoʊniəs/; Greek: Ἀμμώνιος), sometimes called Ammonius the Peripatetic, was a philosopher who taught in Athens in the 1st century AD. He was a teacher of Plutarch, who praises his great learning, and introduces him discoursing on religion and sacred rites. Plutarch wrote a biography of him, which is no longer extant, and also mentioned Ammonius master in other works like the De E apud Delphos within the collection of treatises known as Moralia. From the information supplied by Plutarch, Ammonius was clearly an expert in the works of Aristotle, but he may have nevertheless been a Platonist philosopher rather than a Peripatetic.

He may be the Ammonius of Lamprae (in Attica) quoted by Athenaeus as the author of a book on altars and sacrifices (Greek: Περὶ βωμῶν καὶ Θυσιῶν). Athenaeus also mentions a work on Athenian courtesans (Greek: Περὶ τῶν Ἀθηνσινῆ Ἑταιρίδων) as written by an Ammonius.
