= Hierius =

Hierius (Greek: Ἱέριος) was a Neoplatonic philosopher, a son of Plutarch of Athens, and brother of Asclepigenia, who lived in the early 5th century.

Plutarch instructed both Hierius and Asclepigenia in the Neoplatonist philosophies of his school, and after his death they continued his teachings together with their colleague, Syrianus.
