= Fragmenta Philosophorum Graecorum =

Collection of ancient Greek fragments

- Editor: F. W. A. Mullach
- Genre: Presocratic philosophy
- Publication date: 1860

Fragmenta Philosophorum Graecorum (FPG) is a three-volume collection of fragments of ancient Greek philosophers. It was edited by the German scholar, F.W.A. Mullach, and published in Paris by the Didot family between 1860 and 1881. FPG was the first general collection of fragments of Presocratic philosophy, but also included later material including that of Cleanthes. The volumes contain the original Greek texts with Latin translations and commentary also in Latin.

The FPG's influence can be seen in the work of Friedrich Nietzsche, who used it as a source for his own work on Presocratic philosophers. It has since become known for its shortfalls. FPG was replaced by Die Fragmente der Vorsokratiker, also known as "Diels-Kranz" after its editors.
