= Sosipatra =

Greek Neoplatonist philosopher (4th-century)

Sosipatra (Ancient Greek: Σωσιπάτρα) was a Greek Neoplatonic philosopher and mystic who lived in Ephesus and Pergamon in the first half of the 4th century AD. The story of her life is told in Eunapius' Lives of the Sophists.

== Early life ==
Sosipatra was born in or near Ephesus, likely in the early 4th century AD, to a wealthy family. When she was five years old, two men came to work on her father's estate. When they produced a bounteous harvest beyond all expectation, they persuaded him to hand Sosipatra, and his estate, over to their care. The father was told to leave home for five years, during which Sosipatra was educated by the two men in ancient Chaldean wisdom. When the father returned, Sosipatra was radiant in her beauty, and was said to have possessed extraordinary psychic and clairvoyant abilities.

== Philosopher ==
Sosipatra later married Eustathius of Cappadocia. Eustathius and Sosipatra had three sons, one of whom, Antoninus, became a significant philosopher and theurgist in his own right.

After the death of her husband, she retired to Pergamon, where her skill as a philosopher made her as popular as Aedesius, who also taught philosophy there, and who became her consort; they founded a school of philosophy there. Eunapius tells us that after the students had attended the lectures of the Neoplatonist philosopher Aedesius, they would go to hear Sosipatra's. Her teachings, however, were reserved for the advanced students, or the "inner circle".

== Mystic ==
Some of the stories about Sosipatra's life attribute her with various magical powers. A relative of hers called Philometer was in love with her, and cast a spell on her in order to win her love. She confessed her conflicting emotions to Maximus, who was a pupil of Aedesius and would later become the teacher of the emperor Julian. Maximus was able to detect the presence of the spell and was able to counter it with a spell of his own, defeating Philometer's intent. Because he was ashamed, Sosipatra was able to forgive Philometer, and later we hear of how on one occasion, when she was lecturing on the afterlife of the soul, she had a vision of Philometer in an accident, and was able to send servants to help.

== Legacy ==
No writings of Sosipatra have survived to the modern era, and the account of her life is solely based on Eunapius' Lives of the Sophists, who however portrays her as one of the most important and influential figures whose biographies are contained in his work. Edward Jay Watts suggested that the lack of other accounts of her life could be a result of her significance being overestimated by Eunapius and his followers. On the other hand, Maria Dzielska suggested that the absence of mentions or discussions of Sosipatra by other contemporary and later scholars might have been a form of purposeful damnatio memoriae.

Heidi Marx suggested that the reasons Eunapius devoted a significant amount of space of his Lives to Sosipatra are, first, that she is a respected "teacher of his teacher", and second, that the story of her life is a veiled response to Christian hagiographers who were writing celebratory biographies of female Christian martyrs and saints, all of whom fit the stereotype of "virginal or celibate female ascetic". Eunapius, a pagan, was using Sosipatra's story to promote a different narrative, of what he saw as "a proper elite woman", one who in his view deserves respect, admiration and remembrance while having both a family, a professional career, and enjoying material comforts. Marx also note that while Sosipatra was a "remarkable" woman, the account of her life by Eunapius is "highly fictional" and she is "a figment of Eunapius’s imagination in many important respects".
