= Metrodorus of Cos =

Ancient Greek philosopher

Metrodorus of Cos (Greek: Μητρόδωρος τῆς Κῶ; fl. c. 460 BC) was the son of Epicharmus. Like several of his family he addicted himself partly to the study of Pythagorean philosophy, partly to the science of medicine. He wrote a treatise upon the works of Epicharmus, in which, on the authority of Epicharmus and Pythagoras himself, he maintained that the Doric was the proper dialect of the Orphic hymns.
