= Amelius =

3rd century Neoplatonist philosopher and writer

Amelius Gentilianus (/əˈmiːliəs/; Ancient Greek: Ἀμέλιος Γεντιλιανός), was a Neoplatonic philosopher and writer of the second half of the 3rd century.

== Biography ==
Amelius was a native of Apamea or Tuscany. Originally a student of the works of Numenius of Apamea, he began attending the lectures of Plotinus in the third year after Plotinus came to Rome, and stayed with him for more than twenty years, until 269, when he retired to Apamea in Syria, the native place of Numenius. He is erroneously called Apameos by the Suda.

Amelius was not his original name; he seems to have chosen it to express his contempt for worldly things, as the word ἀμέλεια (ameleia) means negligence in Greek. Porphyry stated of Amelius in the Life of Plotinus, "Amelius preferred to call himself Amerius, changing L for R, because, as he explained, it suited him better to be named from Amereia, Unification, than from Ameleia, Indifference."

Amelius read and wrote voraciously, memorized practically all the teachings of Numenius, and, according to Porphyry, wrote over 100 volumes of sayings and commentaries. Plotinus considered Amelius one of his sharpest disciples. It was Amelius who convinced Porphyry of the truth of the doctrines of Plotinus, and joined with him in the successful effort to induce Plotinus to commit his doctrines to writings. His principal work was a treatise in forty books arguing against the claim that Numenius should be considered the original author of the doctrines of Plotinus. Amelius is also cited by Eusebius and others as having quoted with approval the definition of the Logos in the Gospel of John.
