= Diodorus of Adramyttium =

Ancient Greek rhetorician, philosopher, and military commander

Diodorus (Greek: Διόδωρος) of Adramyttium, was a rhetorician and Academic philosopher. He is known only from the account given by Strabo. He lived at the time of Mithridates (1st century BC), under whom he commanded an army. In order to please the king, he caused all the senators of his native place to be massacred. He afterwards accompanied Mithridates to Pontus, and, after the fall of the king, Diodorus received the punishment for his cruelty. Charges were brought against him at Adramyttium, and as he felt that he could not clear himself, he starved himself to death in despair.
