= Hypomnemata =

Hypomnemata (Ancient Greek: ὑπομνήματα) may refer to:

- Plural of the Greek term hypomnema, later used by Michel Foucault
- Several ancient literary works by writers including:
  - Aeneas Tacticus
  - Aristoxenus
  - Hegesander (historian)
  - Hegesippus (chronicler)
  - Ion of Chios
  - Strabo
  - Symmachus (translator)
- The title of a commentary, as in many of the Commentaria in Aristotelem Graeca; including works by:
  - Porphyry (philosopher)
- Several works by modern authors, including:
  - Jan Bake
  - Thomas Bartholin
  - Heinrich von Cocceji
  - Christian August Crusius
  - John Prideaux
  - Daniel Sennert
  - Simon Stevin
  - Andreas Werckmeister
- Hypomnemata. Untersuchungen zur Antike und zu ihrem Nachleben, a series of scholarly publications in classical studies
