= Sopater of Apamea =

Greek philosopher and advisor to Constantine I

Sopater of Apamea (Ancient Greek: Σώπατρος ὁ Ἀπαμεύς; died before 337 AD) was a distinguished sophist and Neoplatonic philosopher.

== Biography ==
Sopater was a disciple of Iamblichus, after whose death (c. 325 AD), he went to Constantinople, where he enjoyed the favour and personal friendship of Constantine I that appointed him as his assessor, and gave him a seat by his right hand.

The Suda lists that he wrote a variety of works, including one On Providence, and another called People who have Undeserved Good or Bad Fortune. He is distinguished from another sophist of that name "Of Apamea ... (Or rather, of Alexandria)", who wrote epitomes of very many authors and probably also the Historical Extracts, of which Photius has preserved a summary, from which it appears that it contained a vast variety of fact and fiction, collected from a great number of authors.

The most significant work attributed to Sopater is the Diairesis Zetematon (Division of Questions), which is a collection of 81 declamation themes, as well as containing instructions on how they are to be treated. This text gives the best insight to modern scholars on how rhetorics and their pupils worked in the schools.

Sozomenus relates "an invention of persons who desired to vilify the Christian religion", that Constantine asked Sopater for purification after having killed his son Crispus and that Sopater denied him.

Sopater was one of many who were put to death by Constantine, with his death occurring before 337 AD. Zosimus ascribes his death to the machinations of Ablabius. Eunapius adds that Ablabius deceived Constantine into believing that Sopater used magical arts. This was allegedly to detain a fleet carrying grain, thereby preventing it from reaching Constantinople, the empire's capital and Constantine's residence, and disrupting its food supply.
