= Numenius of Apamea =

2nd century Greco-Roman philosopher

Numenius of Apamea (Ancient Greek: Νουμήνιος ὁ ἐξ Ἀπαμείας, Noumēnios ho ex Apameias; Latin: Numenius Apamensis) was a Greek philosopher, who lived in Rome, and flourished during the latter half of the 2nd century AD. He was a Neopythagorean and forerunner of the Neoplatonists.

== Philosophy ==
Statements and fragments of his apparently very numerous works were preserved by Origen, Theodoret, and especially by Eusebius, and from them we may learn the nature of his Platonist-Pythagorean philosophy, and its approximation to the doctrines of Plato.

Numenius was a Neopythagorean, but his object was to trace the doctrines of Plato up to Pythagoras, and at the same time to show that they were not at variance with the dogmas and mysteries of the Brahmins, Jews, Magi and Egyptians. His intention was to restore the philosophy of Plato, the genuine Pythagorean and mediator between Socrates and Pythagoras in its original purity, cleared from the Aristotelian and Stoic doctrines, and purified from the unsatisfactory and perverse explanations, which he said were found even in Speusippus and Xenocrates, and which, through the influence of Arcesilaus and Carneades had led to a bottomless skepticism. His work on the apostasy of the Academy from Plato, to judge from its rather numerous fragments, contained a minute and wearisome account of the outward circumstances of those men, and was full of fabulous tales about their lives, without entering into the nature of their skepticism.

George Karamanolis from the Stanford Encyclopedia of Philosophy noted, "The remains of Numenius' work leave no doubt that he relied primarily on texts of Plato in constructing his own system of principles. Ancient testimonies are, however, divided between those that classify him as a Platonist philosopher (Porphyry, Life of Plot. 14.12, Eusebius, Prep. Ev. XI.21.7) and those that consider him a Pythagorean (Origen, Against Celsus I.15, VI.51, V.38 frs. 1b–1c, 53, Porphyry, Ad Gaurum 34.20–35.2; fr. 36, Calcidius, In Timaeum 297.8 Waszink; fr. 52.2). We should not see any contradiction or even tension in this double classification. Numenius is a Pythagorean Platonist like Moderatus half a century earlier or Eudorus of Alexandria around the turn of the millennium. That is, Numenius accepted both Pythagoras and Plato as the two authorities one should follow in philosophy, but he regarded Plato's authority as subordinate to that of Pythagoras, whom he considered to be the source of all true philosophy—including Plato's own. For Numenius it is just that Plato wrote so many philosophical works, whereas Pythagoras' views were originally passed on only orally (cf. fr. 24.57-60)."

His books On the Good (Peri Tagathou – Περὶ Τἀγαθοῦ) seem to have been of a better kind; in them he had minutely explained, mainly in opposition to the Stoics, that existence could neither be found in the elements because they were in a perpetual state of change and transition, nor in matter because it is vague, inconstant, lifeless, and in itself not an object of our knowledge; and that, on the contrary, existence, in order to resist the annihilation and decay of matter, must itself rather be incorporeal and removed from all mutability, in eternal presence, without being subject to the variation of time, simple and imperturbable in its nature by its own will as well as by influence from without. True existence is identical with the first god existing in and by itself, that is, with good, and is defined as spirit (nous). But as the first (absolute) god existing in itself and being undisturbed in its motion, could not be creative (demiurgikos – δημιουργικός), he thought that we must assume a second god, who keeps matter together, directs its energy to it and to intelligible essences, and imparts its spirit to all creatures; its mind is directed to the first god, in whom it beholds the ideas according to which it arranges the world harmoniously, being seized with a desire to create the world. The first god communicates its ideas to the second, without losing them itself, just as we communicate knowledge to one another, without depriving ourselves of it. In regard to the relation existing between the third and second god, and to the manner in which they also are to be conceived as one (probably in opposition to the vague duration of matter), no information can be derived from the fragments which have come down to us.

== Numenius and Judaism and Christianity ==
Numenius is quoted by multiple ancient writers as having referred to Plato as the "Atticizing Moses," i.e., the Hellenic Moses. "But what is Plato", Numenius said, "but Moses speaking in Attic Greek?" In On the Good (Book 3, fr 10a), Numenius even sets out a story about Jesus (though he doesn't mention the name), and speaks of Moses and Egyptian sages. George Karamanolis further notes: "Such attention to the Jewish tradition is important for the early Christian theologians and apologists who want to establish the superiority of the Jewish-Christian tradition against that of the pagan culture. This attention however is not motivated by historical concerns on the part of Numenius but rather by philosophical ones. Numenius wanted to show that the Jewish nation must be counted among the ancient ones that have a share in logos and also that Moses had a conception of the first principle similar to that of Plato, since both identified God with being."

His chief divergence from Plato is the distinction between the "first god" and the "demiurge." This is probably due to the influence of Jewish-Alexandrian philosophers (especially Philo and his theory of the Logos). According to Proclus, his works were highly esteemed by the Neoplatonists, and Plotinus' student Amelius (who was critical of Gnosticism, see Neoplatonism and Gnosticism) is said to have composed nearly two books of commentaries upon them. Contrary to orthodox Christian teaching (and more in line with the teachings of Gnosticism), like Orpheus and Plato Numenius wrote of the human body as a prison of the soul. Numenius, according to Professor Michael Wagner showed gnostic tendencies in viewing matter as coeval with God.

== Works ==
Fragments of his treatises on the points of divergence between the Academicians and Plato, On the Good (in which according to Origen, Contra Celsum, iv. 51, he makes allusion to Jesus Christ), and on the mystical sayings in Plato, are preserved in the Praeparatio Evangelica of Eusebius. The fragments are collected in F. W. A. Mullach, Fragmenta Philosophorum Graecorum iii.; see also F. Thedinga, De Numenio philosopho Platonico (Bonn, 1875); Heinrich Ritter and Ludwig Preller, Hist. Phil. Graecae (ed. E. Wellmann, 1898), 624–7; T. Whittaker, The Neo-Platonists (1901); E.-A. Leemans, Studie over den Wijsgeer Numenius van Apamea met Uitgave der Fragmenten, Brussels 1937; E. Des Places, Numénius, Fragments, Collection Budé, Paris: Les Belles Lettres, 1973; and Robert Petty, The Fragments of Numenius of Apamea: Text, Translation and Commentary (2012), Westbury, UK.

== See also ==
- Apamea, Syria
- Middle Platonism
