= Demetrius of Amphipolis =

Ancient Greek philosopher

Demetrius of Amphipolis (Greek: Δημήτριος ὁ Ἀμφιπολίτης; fl. 4th century BC) was one of Plato's students. He is perhaps identical with the person mentioned in Plato's Testament as one of the executors of his last will.
