= Oenomaus of Gadara =

2nd century Greek Cynic philosopher

Oenomaus of Gadara (Ancient Greek: Οἰνόμαος ὁ Γαδαρεύς, Oinómaos ho Gadareús; fl. 2nd century AD), was a Pagan Cynic philosopher. He is known principally for the long extracts of a work attacking oracles, which have been preserved among the writings of Eusebius of Caesarea.

== Life ==
Oenomaus was a native of Gadara, which was then a partially Hellenized community in northern Jordan. He is listed in the Chronicle of Jerome as flourishing in the 224th Olympiad (117 to 121 AD): "Plutarch of Chaeronea, Sextus, Agathobulus and Oenomaus are considered notable philosophers." He is also mentioned in The Chronography of George Synkellos associated with events from 109 to 120 AD "The philosopher Sextus, as well as Agathobulus and Oenomaus were becoming known."

It has been suggested that Oenomaus is identical to the philosopher Abnimos ha-Gardi, who is mentioned several times in the Talmud and Midrash as the pagan friend of Rabbi Meir. Although this is not impossible, Donald R. Dudley says there is nothing in the Jewish stories to provide a convincing link to Oenomaus. Louis Feldman accepts the identification.

== Works ==
According to the Suda, Oenomaus wrote the following works:

- On Cynicism (Περὶ Κυνισμοῦ)
- Republic (Πολιτεία)
- On philosophy according to Homer (Περὶ τῆς καθ' Ὅμηρον φιλοσοφίας)
- On Crates and Diogenes (Περὶ Κράτητος καὶ Διογένους)
- And other books about other subjects.

The Emperor Julian also mentions that Oenomaus wrote tragedies. This list, however, does not include the work which is best known to us, namely, his attack on the oracles, which is sometimes entitled Against the Oracle (Κατα Χρηστηρίων), but the proper title of which seems to have been Detection of Deceivers (Γοήτων Φωρά, Latin: Detectio Praestigiatorum).

=== Detection of Deceivers ===
Long extracts of this work are preserved by Eusebius in his Praeparatio Evangelica. Oenomaus was provoked to write this work having himself been deceived by an oracle. In the extracts available to us, Oenomaus attacks the various legendary accounts of the oracles (especially the Oracle at Delphi), launching a facetious attack on the supposed god (Apollo) behind the oracular pronouncements:

In so great a danger all were looking to you, and you were both their informant of the future, and their adviser as to present action. And while they believed you trustworthy, you were sure that they were fools; and that the present opportunity was convenient for drawing on the simpletons, and driving them headlong, not only to the schools of sophistry at Delphi and Dodona, but also to the seats of divination by barley and by wheat-flour, and to the ventriloquists.

His scorn culminates in an attack on the quackery which he sees behind the pronouncements:

And it seems to me that you are no better than the so-called marvel-mongers, nay not even than the rest of the quacks and sophists. At them, however, I do not wonder, that they abandon men for pay; but I do wonder at you, the god, and at mankind, that they pay to be abandoned.

Naturally, not everyone in the Roman world was impressed Oenomaus' thoughts; the Emperor Julian accused him of impiety:

Let not the Cynic be shameless or impudent after the fashion of Oenomaus, a scorner of all things divine and human: rather let him be, like Diogenes, reverent towards the divine.

Oenomaus, like most Cynics, was not an atheist, but he did view the gods as being unconcerned with human affairs. One of his targets was the Stoics who held that Fate governs everything and yet admitted human liberty in how we respond to Fate:

For surely the most ridiculous of all things is this, the mixture and combination of the two notions, that there is something in men's own power, and that there is nevertheless a fixed chain of causation.

This apparent contradiction was at the heart of Oenomaus's attack on oracles, since Apollo at Delphi, far from being able to do his own will, would be compelled by Fate to make his pronouncements. More importantly, oracular pronouncements, according to Oenomaus, if true, remove free-will from human beings.
