= Timolaus of Cyzicus =

Ancient Greek philosopher

Timolaus of Cyzicus (Greek: Τιμόλαος Κυζικηνός) was one of Plato's students.

Cyzicus is an ancient city of Mysia, located in the northwest of Asia Minor.
