= Metrodorus of Athens =

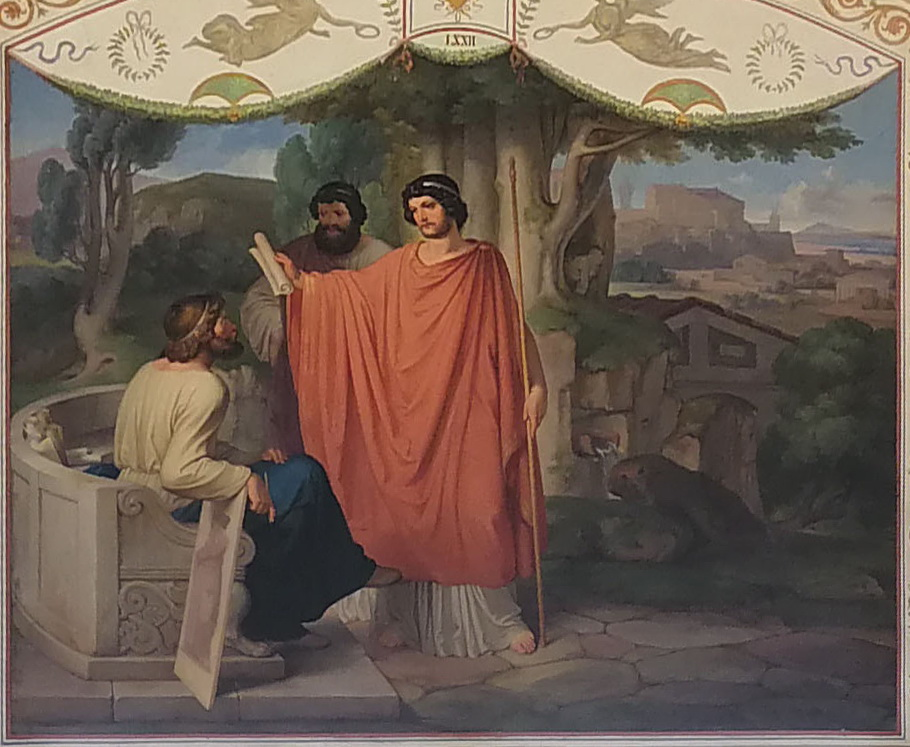

Metrodorus of Athens (Greek: Μητρόδωρος ὁ Ἀθηναῖος) was an Athenian philosopher and painter who flourished in the 2nd century BC. It chanced that Aemilius Paulus, visiting Athens on his return from his victory over Perseus of Macedon in 168 BC, asked for a tutor for his children and a painter to glorify his triumph. The inhabitants suggested Metrodorus as capable of discharging both duties, and it is recorded that Aemilius was entirely satisfied.
