= Antoninus (philosopher) =

Neoplatonist philosopher

Antoninus (Ancient Greek: Ἁντωνῖνος) was a Neoplatonic philosopher who lived in the 4th century. He was a son of Eustathius and Sosipatra, and had a school at Canopus, Egypt. He was an older contemporary of Hypatia who lived and worked nearby in Alexandria. He devoted himself wholly to his pupils, but he never expressed any opinion upon divine matters, and although Eunapius attributes this to Antoninus' piety, he also points out that Antoninus refrained from theurgic rites "perhaps because he kept a wary eye on the imperial views and policy which were opposed to these practices." His moral conduct is described as exemplary. He and his disciples were strongly attached to paganism; but he is said to have been able to see that its end was near at hand, and he predicted that after his death all the splendid temples of the gods would be changed into tombs:

He foretold to all his followers that after his death the temple would cease to be, and even the great and holy temples of Serapis would pass into formless darkness and be transformed, and that a fabulous and unseemly gloom would hold sway over the fairest things on earth. To all these prophecies time bore witness, and in the end his prediction gained the force of an oracle.
