= Philiscus of Thessaly =

Philiscus of Thessaly (2nd-3rd century) was a Roman era sophist, who according to Philostratus, joined 'geometricians and philosophers' associated with Julia Domna (Empress and wife of Roman Emperor Septimius Severus)
