= Theodorus of Asine =

Ancient Neoplatonist philosopher

Theodorus of Asine (Greek: Θεόδωρος Ἀσιναῖος; fl. 3rd–4th century AD) was a Neoplatonic philosopher, and a native of one of the towns which bore the name of Asine.

He was a disciple of Iamblichus, and one of the most eminent of the Neoplatonists. Proclus repeatedly mentions him in his commentaries on Plato, and frequently adds to his name some laudatory epithet,"the great," "the admirable," "the noble." He wrote a work on the soul, now lost. It is cited by Nemesius of Emesa in his De Natura Hominis.

Theodorus believed there was a First Cause, from which emanated a triad that was ‘The One’ This ‘One' therefore acted as a Trinity, or Three-in One (similar to that of Brahma-Vishnu-Siva and of the Christian Trinity). Each member of the triad was equivalent to one of the three sounds in hen, the Greek word for 'One' - an aspiration, a long vowel, and a terminal nasal emanation into the cosmos – which is startling similar to ohm and its symbolism. And, like the sound of ohm and Brahma as breath, it represented life, creation, the universe in its entirety, and thus the transcendent One, the All. Furthermore, as Gersch points out in reference to Proclus, but in a way that is also relevant to Theodorus' use of hen, the three syllables are surrounded by, enclosed within, the eternal silence of the One – since He is ultimate silence. This too is part of ohm. And, as Gersch also points out, this divine silence became a significant part of later Neoplatonism and Christian mysticism, through the works of Pseudo-Dionysius.

Theodoros was also, according to both Iamblichus and Proclus, concerned with numerology – relating the numbers of letters in words to their hidden meanings. He apparently believed these hidden clues offered insights into his theology of the cosmos (metaphysics), something that both Iamblichus and Proclus criticised, in part because it suggested a causal relationship that sprung from number upwards towards the divine.
