= Asclepiodotus of Alexandria =

Roman-era philosopher

Asclepiodotus
- Born: Alexandria, Roman Egypt

Philosophical work
- Era: Ancient philosophy
- Region: Western philosophy
- School: Neoplatonism

Asclepiodotus of Alexandria (Greek: Ἀσκληπιόδοτος) was a Neoplatonic philosopher who lived in the second half of the 5th century.

Asclepiodotus was born in Alexandria in Roman Egypt. He studied under Proclus in Athens, but eventually moved to Aphrodisias, where he maintained a philosophy school jointly with another man also called Asclepiodotus, whose daughter, Damiane, he married. Asclepiodotus also taught Damascius, who describes him in disparaging terms, in part because of his disregard for oracular lore:

Asclepiodotus' mind was not perfect, as most people thought. He was extremely sharp at raising questions, but not so acute in his understanding. His was an uneven intelligence, especially when it came to divine matters – the invisible and intelligible concept of Plato's lofty thought. Even more wanting was he in the field of higher wisdom – the Orphic and Chaldean lore which transcends common sense.

He and his wife visited the shrine of Isis at Menouthis in Egypt, in order to cure her childlessness. A baby was produced, but the local Christians claimed it had been bought from a priestess, and used the affair as a pretext to destroy the shrine.

He also wrote a commentary on Plato's Timaeus, which does not survive.
