= Eustathius of Cappadocia =

Greek philosopher

Eustathius of Cappadocia (Greek: Εὐστάθιος), was a Neoplatonic philosopher and sophist, and a pupil of Iamblichus and Aedesius, who lived at the beginning of the 4th century CE. When Aedesius was obliged to quit Cappadocia, Eustathius was left behind in his place. Eunapius, to whom alone we are indebted for our knowledge of Eustathius, declares that he was the best man and a great orator, whose speech in sweetness equalled the songs of the Sirens. His reputation was so great, that when the Persians besieged Antioch, and the empire was threatened with a war, the emperor Constantius II was prevailed upon to send Eustathius, although he was a pagan, as ambassador to king Shapur II, in 358, who is said to have been quite enchanted by his oratory. His countrymen and friends who longed for his return, sent deputies to him, but he refused to come back to his country on account of certain signs and omens. His wife Sosipatra is said to have even excelled her husband in talent and learning. They had three sons, one of which, Antoninus, also became a philosopher.
