= Asclepigenia =

Philosopher and mystic

Asclepigenia (Ancient Greek: Ἀσκληπιγένεια; fl. 430–485 AD) was a Neoplatonic philosopher who lived in the 5th century AD who was the daughter of Plutarch of Athens, the founder of the New Academy in Athens. She and her brother Hierius studied under the doctrines of Plato and Aristotle under her father. According to Marinus' Life of Proclus, Proclus, who would later go on to be the head of the Athenian academy, studied theurgy under her. She is said to have died in the year 485 A.D.
