= Hegias =

Neoplatonist philosopher

Hegias (Greek: Ἡγίας) was a Neoplatonic philosopher who lived in the 5th and 6th centuries. He may have been the great-grandson or great-great-grandson of Plutarch of Athens, the founder of the Neoplatonist Academy in Athens. Hegias studied under Proclus at the school in Athens, when Proclus was an old man c. 480. Proclus showed him great favour, and considered him worthy of hearing his lectures on the Chaldean Oracles.

After the death of Proclus in 485, Marinus became the scholarch of the school. Hegias, as a leading figure in the school, seems to have opposed Marinus, and his pupil Isidore, on many doctrinal matters. After the death of Marinus, Isidore became the new scholarch, but he did not hold the position for very long before retiring to Alexandria. Hegias may have become the new head of the school, In any case, the school continued to be divided, and Damascius, who was a student in the school during this time, presents Hegias in a very unfavourable light in his Life of Isidore. Hegias strongly emphasized religious ritual, "wanting to be, above all else, holy, ... he changed out of zeal, many long-established things." His religious activities created enemies in the community, but we hear nothing more about Hegias after this. The next scholarch of the academy was Damascius.
