= Agapius of Athens =

5th-6th-century Greek philosopher

Agapius (Greek: Ἀγάπιος; c. 460 – after 511) was a Neoplatonic philosopher who lived in Athens. He was a notable philosopher in the Neoplatonist school in Athens when Marinus of Neapolis was scholarch after the death of Proclus (c. 485). He was admired for his love of learning and for putting forward difficult problems.

He may be the Agapius under whom John Lydus heard some lectures on Platonist philosophy, while he was studying Aristotelian doctrines in Constantinople in 511, and of whom the poet Christodorus in his work On the Disciples of the Great Proclus stated that "Agapius is assuredly the last but the first of all."
