= Metrodorus of Lampsacus (the elder) =

5th-century BC Greek philosopher

- Μητρόδωρος Λαμψακηνός
- Born: fl. 5th century BC
- Died: 464 BC

Philosophical work
- Era: Presocratic philosophy
- Region: Ancient Greek philosophy
- Main interests: Homeric scholarship, Allegorical interpretation
- Notable ideas: Interpretation of gods as allegorical depictions of forces of nature.

Metrodorus of Lampsacus (Ancient Greek: Μητρόδωρος Λαμψακηνός, romanized: Mētrodōros Lampsakēnos; fl. 5th century BC) was a pre-Socratic Greek philosopher from town of Lampsacus on the eastern shore of the Hellespont. According to Diogenes Laertius, he was a contemporary and friend of Anaxagoras. He died in 464 BC.

The earliest surviving mention of Metrodorus is in Plato's dialogue Ion as one of the interpreters of Homer, along with Stesimbrotos of Thasos and Glaucon of Rhegium. who expanded upon Anaxagoras' theories of allegorical interpretation. The leading feature of Metrodorus' system of interpretation being that the deities and stories in Homer were to be understood as modes of representing physical powers and phenomena.

Similarities have also been drawn between Metrodorus' doctrines and the allegorical interpretations of an Orphic poem found in the Derveni papyrus since its discovery in 1962. Although Metrodorus' authorship of that particular work has been rejected by modern scholarship, his derivation of physical doctrines via allegorical interpretation may have influenced it.
