= Metrodorus of Stratonicea =

Greek philosopher (fl. 110 BC)

Metrodorus of Stratonikeia (Caria) (Greek: Μητρόδωρος τῆς Στρατονικείας) was at first a disciple of Epicureanism, but afterwards attached himself to Carneades. His defection from the Epicurean school is almost unique. It is explained by Cicero as being due to his theory that the scepticism of Carneades was merely a means of attacking the Stoics on their own ground. Metrodorus held that Carneades was in reality a loyal follower of Plato. Cicero speaks of him as an orator of great fire and volubility. He flourished about 110 BC.
