= Theano (philosopher) =

6th-century BC Pythagorean philosopher

- Θεανώ
- Born: c. 6th century BC; Croton or Metapontum
- Spouse: Pythagoras or Brontinus

Philosophical work
- Era: Ancient Greek philosophy
- School: Pythagoreanism

Theano (/θiˈænoʊ/; Greek: Θεανώ) was a 6th-century BC Pythagorean philosopher. She has been called the wife or student of Pythagoras, although others see her as the wife of Brontinus. Her place of birth and the identity of her father is uncertain as well. Many Pythagorean writings were attributed to her in antiquity, including some letters and a few fragments from philosophical treatises, although these are all regarded as spurious by modern scholars.

== Life ==
Little is known about the life of Theano, and the few details on her life from ancient testimony are contradictory. According to Porphyry, she came from Crete and was the daughter of Pythonax. In the catalog of Aristoxenus of Tarentum quoted by Iamblichus, she is the wife of Brontinus, and from Metapontum in Magna Graecia, while Diogenes Laertius reports a tradition from Hermesianax where she came from Crotone, was the daughter of Brontinus, married Pythagoras, and while some claim that after Pythagoras' passing, she took over his school, the evidence is overwhelmingly clear that was not the case.

== Writings ==
Many writings were attributed to Theano in antiquity. The Suda attributes to her works with the titles Pythagorean Apophthegms, Advice to Women, On Pythagoras, On Virtue and Philosophical Commentaries, which have not survived. In addition, a short fragment attributed to her from a work titled On Piety (Peri eusebeias) is preserved in the Anthologium of Stobaeus. In addition, nine sayings and seven epistles in Greek have survived through medieval manuscript traditions. The letters were probably composed between the 2nd and 5th centuries AD, but the sayings are earlier.

These writings are all widely considered by modern scholarship to be pseudepigrapha, works that were written long after Theano's death by later Pythagoreans, which attempt to correct doctrinal disputes with later philosophers or apply Pythagorean philosophy to a woman's life. Some sources claim that Theano wrote about either the doctrine of the golden mean in philosophy, or the golden ratio in mathematics, but there is no evidence from the time to justify this claim.

=== On Piety ===
The surviving fragment of On Piety preserved in Stobaeus concerns a Pythagorean analogy between numbers and objects;

I have learned that many of the Greeks suppose Pythagoras said that everything came to be from number. This statement, however, poses a difficulty—how something that does not even exist is thought to beget things. But he did not say that things came to be from number, but according to number. For in number is the primary ordering, by virtue of whose presence, in the realm of things that can be counted, too, something takes its place as first, something as second, and the rest follow in order.

Walter Burkert notes that this statement, that "number does not even exist" contradicts the Platonic idealism of the Neopythagoreans and Neoplatonists, and attributes it to the Hellenistic period, before the advent of Neopythagoreanism in the early Roman period.

=== Letters ===
The various surviving letters deal with domestic concerns: how a woman should bring up children, how she should treat servants, and how she should behave virtuously towards her husband.

The preserved letters are as follows:

- To Eubule: On caring for infants.
- To Euclides: A short letter to a physician who is ill.
- To Eurydice: On behavior when a husband is unfaithful.
- To Callisto: On etiquette towards maids.
- To Nicostrate: On behavior when a husband is unfaithful.
- To Rhodope: On a philosopher named Cleon.
- To Timonides: Addressed to an unfaithful lover

There are also references to a letter addressed To Timareta, which is referenced by Julius Pollux in his Onomasticon for its use of the word οἰκοδεσπότης.

=== Syriac tradition ===
In addition to the works in Greek, there is a collection of 65 sayings in Syriac attributed to Theano. Titled Advice of Theano, it is a gnomology originally composed in Greek around the 3rd century. It is pagan in origin and was not "Christianized" by its Syriac translators and copyists. In addition to the Advice, several isolated sayings attributed to Theano and a passage in the scholia of Pseudo-Nonnus are found in Syriac translation (from lost Greek originals).
