= Aeschines of Neapolis =

2nd-century BC Greek philosopher

Aeschines of Neapolis (Gr. Αἰσχίνης ὁ Νεαπολίτης; of modern Naples) was an Academic Skeptic who shared the leadership of the Academy at Athens together with Charmadas and Clitomachus about 110 BC, when Clitomachus was an old man. Diogenes Laërtius says that he was a pupil and favourite (paidika) of Melanthius of Rhodes.
