= Menedemus of Pyrrha =

Ancient Greek philosopher

Menedemus of Pyrrha (Lesbos) (Ancient Greek: Μενέδημος; fl. c. 350 BC, was a member of Plato's Academy, during the time of Speusippus. Upon the death of Speusippus in 339 BC, an election was held for the next scholarch of the Academy. Menedemus and Heraclides narrowly lost to Xenocrates. Menedemus left the Academy, and set up a school of his own.
