= Eclecticism =

Conceptual approach that draws upon multiple theories, styles, or ideas

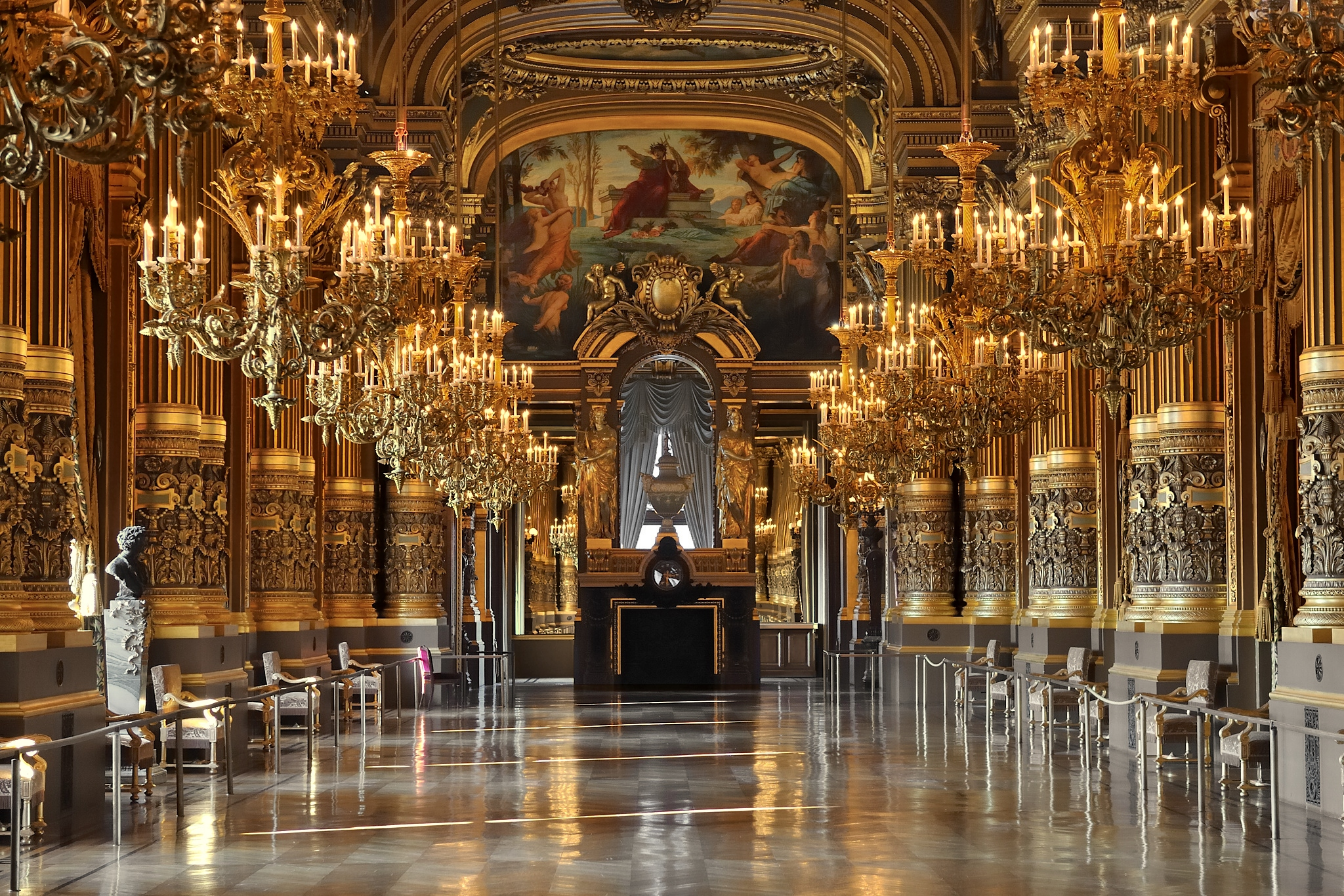
The grand foyer of the Palais Garnier, by Charles Garnier, 1860–1875. Stylistically, it aimed for a Baroque opulence through lavishly decorated monumental structures that evoked Louis XIV's Versailles. However, it was not just a revival of the Baroque, being more of a synthesis of Classicist styles, like Renaissance, Baroque, Rococo, Neoclassicism etc. Thus, it is an example of eclecticism in architecture.

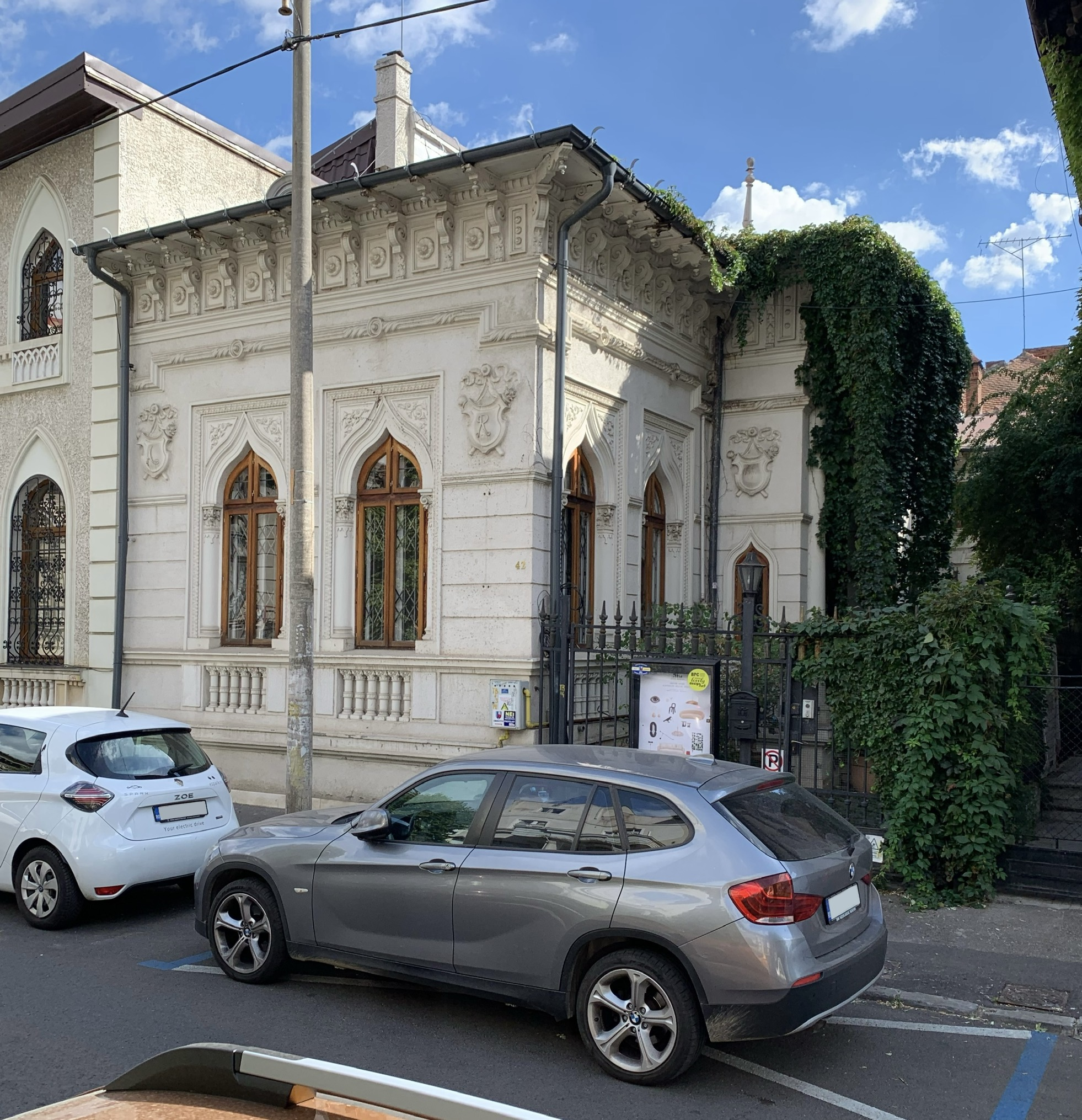
Early Romanian Revival house on Strada Grigore Alexandrescu in Bucharest, Romania, unknown architect, c. 1900, that mixes Beaux-Arts and Romanian Revival elements and proportions

Eclecticism is a conceptual approach that does not hold rigidly to a single paradigm or set of assumptions, but instead draws upon multiple theories, styles, or ideas to gain complementary insights into a subject, or applies different theories in particular cases. However, this is often without conventions or rules dictating how or which theories were combined.

Eclecticism in ethics, philosophy, politics, and religion is often compared to syncretism, but the two concepts differ in their approach to combining elements from different traditions. While syncretism in religion involves the merging or assimilation of several distinct traditions into a new, unified system, eclecticism adopts elements from various systems without necessarily integrating them into a single cohesive framework. This distinction allows for a broader, more inclusive approach in eclecticism, where the selection is based on individual merit or preference rather than an attempt to create a new unified tradition.

== Origin ==
Eclecticism was first recorded to have been practiced by a group of ancient Greek and Roman philosophers who attached themselves to no real system, but selected from existing philosophical beliefs those doctrines that seemed most reasonable to them. Out of this collected material they constructed their new system of philosophy. The term comes from the Greek ἐκλεκτικός (eklektikos), literally "choosing the best", and that from ἐκλεκτός (eklektos), "picked out, select". Well known eclectics in Greek philosophy were the Stoics Panaetius and Posidonius, and the New Academics Carneades and Philo of Larissa. Among the Romans, Cicero was thoroughly eclectic, as he united the Peripatetic, Stoic, and New Academic doctrines. Philo's successor and Cicero's teacher Antiochus of Ascalon is credited with influencing the Academy so that it finally transitioned from Skepticism to Eclecticism. Other eclectics included Varro and Seneca the Younger.

According to Rošker and Suhadolnik, however, even though eclecticism had a Greek origin, the term was rarely used and it was even given a negative connotation by historians of Greek thought, associating it with the description for impure and unoriginal thinking. Scholars such as Clement of Alexandria maintained that eclecticism had a long history in Greek philosophy and it is underpinned by a deeper metaphysical and theological conviction concerning the absolute/God as the source of all noble thoughts and that all parts of the truth can be found among the various philosophical systems.

== Usage ==
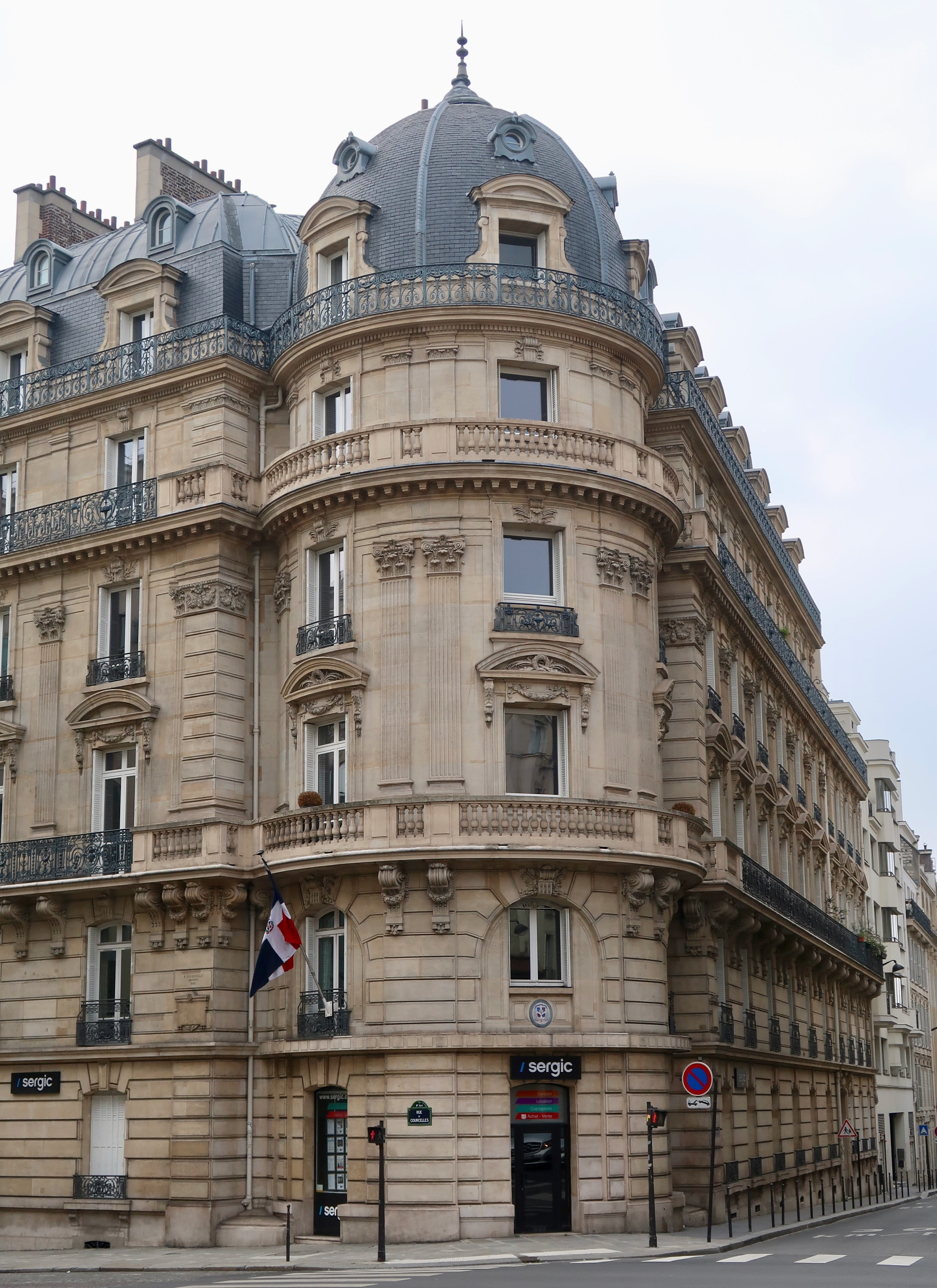
Building no. 45 on Rue de Courcelles in Paris, unknown architect, unknown date, an example of 19th century architecture that can be called "Eclectic" due to the fact that it uses elements from multiple Classicist styles, like the French Baroque and the Louis XVI style

=== Architecture and art ===
The term eclecticism is used to describe the combination, in a single work, of elements from different historical styles, chiefly in architecture and, by implication, in the fine and decorative arts. The term is sometimes also loosely applied to the general stylistic variety of 19th-century architecture after neoclassicism (c. 1820), although the revivals of styles in that period have, since the 1970s, generally been referred to as aspects of historicism.

Eclecticism plays an important role in critical discussions and evaluations but is somehow distant from the actual forms of the artifacts to which it is applied, and its meaning is thus rather indistinct. The simplest definition of the term—that every work of art represents the combination of a variety of influences—is so basic as to be of little use. In some ways Eclecticism is reminiscent of Mannerism in that the term was used pejoratively for much of the period of its currency, although, unlike Mannerism, Eclecticism never amounted to a movement or constituted a specific style: it is characterized precisely by the fact that it was not a particular style.

=== Martial arts ===
Some martial arts can be described as eclectic in the sense that they borrow techniques from a wide variety of other martial arts.

=== Philology ===
In textual criticism, eclecticism is the practice of examining a wide number of text witnesses and selecting the variant that seems best. The result of the process is a text with readings drawn from many witnesses. In a purely eclectic approach, no single witness is theoretically favored. Instead, the critic forms opinions about individual witnesses, relying on both external and internal evidence.

Since the mid-19th century, eclecticism, in which there is no a priori bias to a single manuscript, has been the dominant method of editing the Greek text of the New Testament (currently, the United Bible Society, 4th ed. and Nestle-Åland, 27th ed.). Even so, the oldest manuscripts, being of the Alexandrian text-type, are the most favored, and the critical text has an Alexandrian disposition.

=== In Western philosophy ===
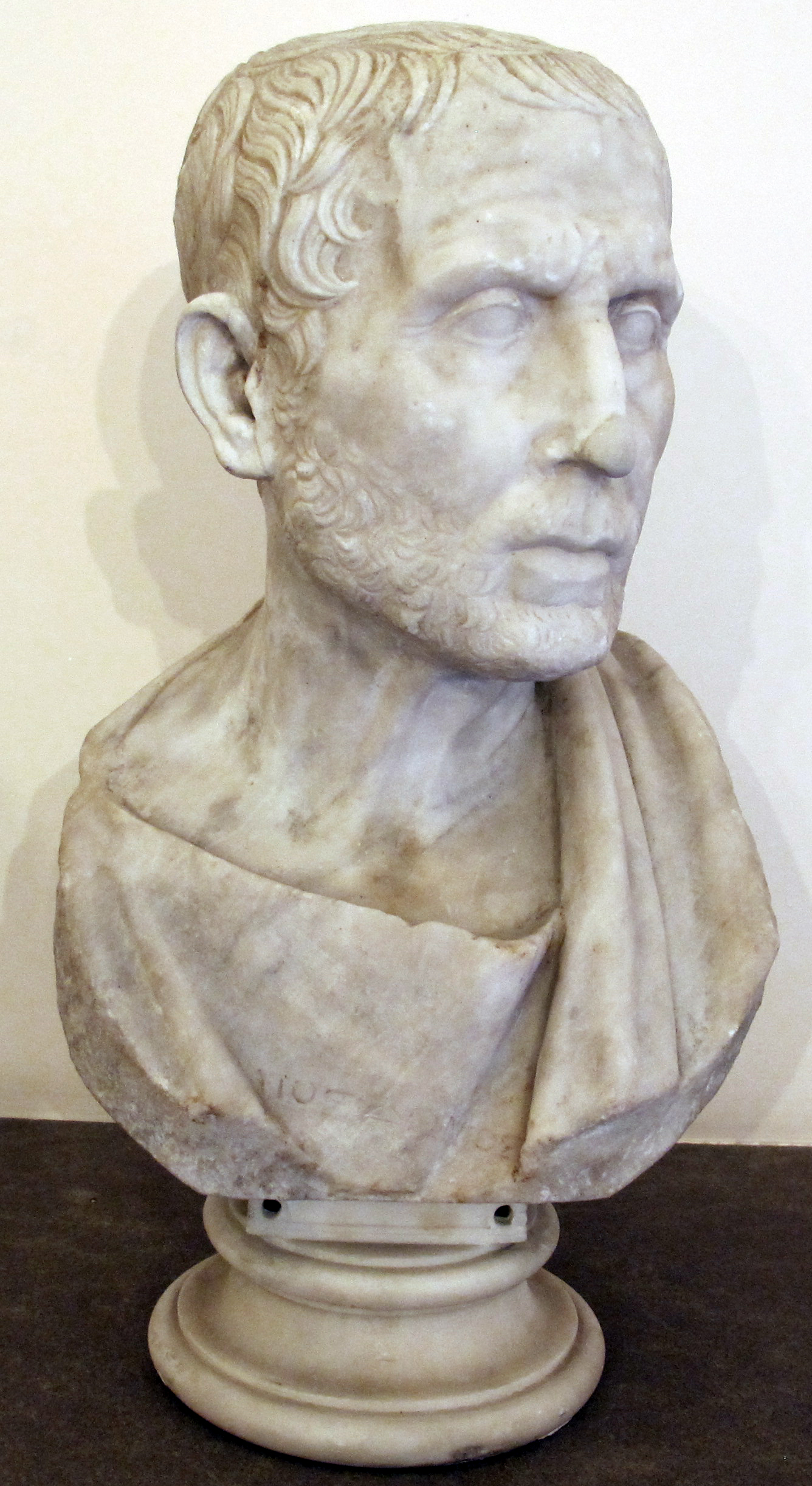
Posidonius (c. 135 – c. 51 BC), who followed Stoicism, but also the works of Plato, Aristotle and Greco-Roman natural philosophers.

In Hellenistic philosophy, the Eclectics used elements from multiple philosophies, texts, life experiences, and their own philosophical ideas. These ideas include life as connected with existence, knowledge, values, reason, mind, and language. This movement is closely associated with Middle Platonism. Eclectic thinkers thrived during the Roman Empire. According to the Catholic Encyclopedia, eclecticism "aims at constructing a system broad and vague enough to include, or not to exclude, the principles of the divers schools, though giving at times more importance to those of one school". Roman Empire eclectic figures could belong to a specific philosophical schools while remaining eclectic and drawing on different traditions. Key figures include Asclepiades of Bithynia, Boethius, Panetius of Rhodes, Posidonius, Demetrius the Cynic, Demonax, Philo of Larissa, Antiochus of Ascalon, Andronicus of Rhodes, Aristocles, Alexander of Aphrodisias, Porphyry and Simplicius.

Antiochus of Ascalon (c. 125 – c. 69 BC) was the pupil of Philo of Larissa, and the teacher of Cicero. Through his influence, Platonism transitioned from the Academic Skepticism of the New Academy to Eclecticism. Whereas Philo had adhered to the doctrine that there is nothing absolutely certain, Antiochus abandoned this to support dogmatism. Among his objections to skepticism was the consideration that without firm convictions no rational content of life is possible. Antiochus pointed out that it is a contradiction to assert that nothing can be asserted or to prove that nothing can be proved; that we cannot speak of false ideas and at the same time deny the distinction between false and true. He expounded the Academic, Peripatetic, and Stoic systems in such a way as to show that these three schools deviated from one another only in minor points. Antiochus was chiefly interested in ethics, in which he tried to find a middle way between Zeno of Citium, Aristotle, and Plato. For instance, he said that virtue suffices for eudaimonia, but for the highest grade of happiness, bodily and external goods are necessary as well.

This eclectic tendency was enabled by the fact that most of Plato's works were non-dogmatic. Middle Platonism was promoted by the necessity of considering the main theories of the post-Platonic schools of philosophy, such as the Aristotelian logic and the Stoic psychology and ethics (theory of goods and emotions). On the one hand the Middle Platonists were engaged like the later Peripatetics in scholarly activities such as the exposition of Plato's doctrines and the explanation of his dialogues; on the other hand they attempted to develop the Platonic theories systematically. In so far as it was subject in this to the influence of Neopythagoreanism, it was of considerable importance in preparing the way for Neoplatonism.

In modern philosophy, Victor Cousin was the founder of modern Eclecticism.

=== Psychology ===
Eclecticism is recognized in approaches to psychology that see many factors influencing behavior and cognition or psyche. In the 1970s, psychologists started using whichever approaches and techniques that they deemed appropriate for their client. They take multiple perspectives into consideration while identifying, explaining, and changing the behavior of the client.

=== In Asian thought and religion ===
Indian religions and philosophies are often eclectic, in the sense of drawing upon ideas and practices from diverse philosophical and religious traditions. Indian thought included a diversity of traditions, each with its own distinct teachings and practices, such as Vedānta, Sāṃkhya, Nyāya, and Buddhism. These traditions have shown a remarkable ability to assimilate and adapt elements from one another. This tendency goes back to the Upaniṣads, which incorporate and synthesize a wide array of ideas about the nature of reality, the self (ātman), and the ultimate principle (Brahman). The Upaniṣads do not represent a single, uniform doctrine but rather various perspectives.

Medieval India saw the rise of bhakti movements, which were also characterized by their eclectic use of varying philosophical ideas and religious practices, including Vedānta, Tantra, and local folk practices. Similarly, the Sikh tradition exemplifies eclecticism by combining elements of bhakti Hinduism and Islam. Modern Hinduism is also the result of an eclectic process that brought together numerous philosophical and religious influences (Unifying Hinduism). Modern Hindu figures like Swami Vivekananda and Mahatma Gandhi continued this tradition of eclecticism. Vivekananda drew upon Vedānta, Sāṃkhya-Yoga, and Western philosophy to present a universalist view of religion. Gandhi, influenced by Jain, Hindu, and Christian ideas, developed a unique philosophy of nonviolence (ahimsa) and social activism.

Indian Buddhism, especially the Mahāyāna tradition is also notable for its openness to a wide range of philosophical ideas and practices. Mahāyāna absorbed and reinterpreted concepts from earlier Buddhist schools while also integrating elements and deities from non-Buddhist traditions. The later Vajrayana Buddhist movement also drew on numerous Mahayana streams of thought as well as on Shaiva Tantra to develop its systems of thought and practice.

In a similar fashion, Chinese thought can also tend towards the harmonization of diverse philosophical and religious traditions, allowing for the coexistence and mutual influence of Confucianism, Daoism, Buddhism, and other indigenous beliefs. The three major Chinese religious and philosophical traditions, namely Confucianism, Daoism, and Buddhism, have been coexisting and interacting with one another for over two millennia. The synthesis of the "Three Teachings" (Confucianism, Daoism, and Buddhism) became increasingly pronounced in later periods of Chinese history. The Song dynasty (960–1279 CE) witnessed the rise of Neo-Confucianism, a movement that sought to revitalize Confucian thought in response to the growing influence of Buddhism and Daoism. Neo-Confucian thinkers such as Zhu Xi and Wang Yangming developed more systematic and metaphysical systems which drew upon other systems of thought, including Buddhism. In the modern era, intellectuals of the late Qing dynasty and the Republican period, such as Kang Youwei and Liang Qichao, sought to integrate Western philosophical ideas with traditional Chinese thought. In contemporary China, there is a renewed interest in Confucianism, often blended with elements of modernity and other philosophical systems to address current social and ethical issues.

== See also ==
- Eclectic medicine
- Eclecticism in art
- Eclecticism in music
- Eclecticism in textual criticism
- Pastiche
- Perspectivism
- Polystylism
- Sheilaism
