= Aristanax =

Aristanax (Ancient Greek: Ἀριστάναξ) can refer to a number of people from classical antiquity:

- Aristanax, a Platonist who lived in the 2nd century BCE, and was the student of Carneades of Cyrene.
- Aristanax, a priest of the sun in ancient Berytus in the 2nd century BCE.
- Aristanax, an ancient Greek physician, of whose life nothing is known, and of whose date it can be positively determined only that, as he is mentioned by Soranus of Ephesus, he must have lived some time in or before the second century CE. His most notable theory appears to have been that female children ought to be weaned later than male children.
