= Antiochus of Ascalon =

Ancient Greek philosopher

- Άντίοχος ὁ Ἀσκαλώνιος
- Born: c. 135-130 BC; Ascalon
- Died: c. 68 B.C. Syria
- Occupation: Diplomat
- Family: Aristus of Ascalon (brother)

Philosophical work
- Era: Hellenistic philosophy
- Region: Ancient Greek philosophy
- School: Middle Platonism
- Institutions: Platonic Academy
- Notable students: Cicero, Varro
- Language: Ancient Greek
- Main interests: Epistemology, Ethics
- Notable ideas: Katalepsis as a Platonic doctrine, synthesis of Platonism, Stoicism and Peripateticism

Antiochus of Ascalon (/ænˈtaɪəkəs/; Ancient Greek: Άντίοχος ὁ Ἀσκαλώνιος; c. 135/130 – c. 68 BC) was a 1st-century BC Platonist philosopher. He rejected skepticism, blended Stoic doctrines with Platonism, and was the first philosopher in the tradition of Middle Platonism.

Antiochus moved to Athens early in his life and became a pupil of Philo of Larissa at the Platonic Academy, but he went on to reject the prevailing Academic skepticism of Philo and his predecessors. This led to his resignation from the academy and the establishment of his own school, which he named the "Old Academy" as he claimed it was closer to original doctrines of Platonism that he believed had been betrayed by the skeptics of the New Academy under Philo. His students at this new institution included the Roman politicians Varro and Cicero. Antiochus was also the friend of the Roman politician and general Lucullus, whom he accompanied on a trip to North Africa and on a campaign to Armenia.

After the decline of the New Academy in the late 1st century BC, his school was the sole inheritor of the Platonic tradition in Athens, which began the period of philosophy known as Middle Platonism. Antiochus endeavoured to bring some doctrines of the Stoics and the Peripatetics into Platonism, and stated, in opposition to Philo, that the mind could distinguish true from false, following the Stoic doctrine of katalepsis. In doing so, he claimed to be reviving the doctrines of the Old Academy. Despite his emphasis on the Platonic tradition, his ideas were often more Stoic than Platonist; in particular, he gave up the Platonic philosophy of transcendence in favor of a materialistic doctrine of nature.

== Life ==
The primary surviving account of Antiochus' life is a biography of him written by Philodemus in his History of the Academy, which survives in a fragmentary papyrus recovered from the Villa of the Papyri in Herculaneum. (Note: Index Academicorum) However, due to the poor state of preservation of the papyrus, a significant part of the relevant section is either lost or difficult to read. Some additional biographical information comes the Academica of Cicero, who was a close friend of Antiochus, and from the later biographer Plutarch in his Life of Lucullus and Life of Cicero.

=== Early life and education ===
Antiochus was born in the late 1st century BC, probably between 135 BC and 130 BC. Nothing is known about his early life, but both Strabo and Stephanus of Byzantium mention him as a notable philosopher from Ascalon. He travelled to Athens and joined the Platonic Academy, after 110 BC, when Philo of Larissa was the current scholarch of the academy. Antiochus studied under Philo for a significant portion of his career; his relationship with Philo as a student lasted longer than that of any of the scholar's other students. However, the two philosophers later became estranged, as a result of a disagreement about skepticism.

While at Athens, Antiochus also studied Stoicism, a school of Hellenistic philosophy that rivaled the academy. He studied under Mnesarchus, who had recently taken charge of the Stoa Poikile after the death of its previous scholarch Panaetius. The contact to the Stoa was probably mediated by the Stoic philosopher Sosus, who also came from Ascalon, and whom Antiochus would go on to name the title of one of his later works after. It is unclear whether Antiochus initially belonged to the Stoics and only later switched to the academy, or whether, like many other philosophers of the time, he was an academic from the start and only attended Stoic courses on the side.

=== The Old Academy ===
Under the direction of Philo, who was scholarch from 110/109 to 88, the academy adhered to Academic skepticism, which had been the predominant form of Platonism since it was introduced by Arcesilaus in approximately 265 BCE, a period called the Middle Academy. This skepticism became even more strict under the New Academy of Carneades, who had been the scholarch of the academy until 137/136. Philo, who only joined the academy after Carneades' health-related resignation, represented a milder version of skepticism. Skepticism was coupled with a sharp rejection of the Stoic doctrine of katalepsis.

Antiochus tended to abandon the core theses of skepticism, which seemed untenable to him. In doing so, he came into conflict with the prevailing current in the academy, which at the time was already moderate and willing to compromise, but was still committed to the tradition of Carneades. After some time, this led to him leaving the academy and founding his own school in Athens. In an attempt to connect his school with Platonism before the introduction of skepticism, he called his school the Old Academy, which during the later Roman Empire this would be referred to as the "fifth academy", with Philo being understood as the founder of a "fourth academy".

=== Exile in North Africa ===
In 88 BC, the political turmoil in Athens that would ultimately result from the First Mithridatic War caused many members of Athens' upper class, including Philo and many of his students, to flee to Rome. Antiochus, however, who was no longer a member of that school by this point, did not follow them and appears to have travelled to Alexandria instead. Either in a camp of the Romans besieging Athens, or perhaps in Alexandria itself, he met Lucullus, a Roman officer who served under Sulla. Lucullus, who later achieved prominence as a politician and general in the wars against Mithridates, became his friend and patron.

In 87 BC, Philo wrote a treatise in two books from his exile in Rome where he gave concessions on some important principles of skepticism, but did not renounce the claim to continue to be a skeptic in the tradition of Carneades, and stuck to the idea of a unified teaching tradition at the academy since it was founded. When Antiochus received these Roman books (Note: This work of Philo, along with all of his others has not survived; since the title is unknown, it is referred to in research as his "Roman books", because their authentic title is unknown.) in Alexandria in the winter of 87/86, he reacted with indignation and wrote a response entitled Sosus, which was named for the Stoic philosopher Sosus of Ascalon. With the publication of Sosus, Antiochus' break with the New Academy and Philo was complete; he had disputed both the soundness of Philo's philosophical approach and the historical accuracy of his understanding of the history of philosophy.

=== Return to Athens ===
Later, probably soon after the end of the conflict there, Antiochus returned to Athens, which was controlled by the Romans from March 86 onward, and resumed his teaching. Since the skeptical "New Academy" had not survived the turmoil of war – after Philo's flight apparently no new scholarch was elected – Antiochus' "Old Academy" was now the only institution that claimed to continue the tradition of Plato's Academy, emphasizing his Academy's sharp contrast to the skepticism of the New Academy. However, Antiochus did not continue the Platonic Academy as it had been maintained for most of the Hellenistic period; Antiochus did not teach on the site where the academy had been seated since Plato's time, which was destroyed in the Sack of Athens, but at the Ptolemaium, a gymnasium in the city centre, while the academy grounds were no longer used for philosophical classes.

Probably around 83 BC, the famous Roman scholar Varro stayed in Athens and studied under Antiochus. In 79, a circle of prominent Romans was gathered in the "Old Academy": Cicero, who spent six months with Antiochus, his younger brother Quintus Tullius Cicero, his cousin Lucius Tullius Cicero, his friend Titus Pomponius Atticus and the politician Marcus Pupius Piso. Atticus shared a household with Antiochus. The poet and Epicurean philosopher Philodemus of Gadara, who wrote the surviving biography of him, was also one of Antiochus' friends. Ambassadorial trips by Antiochus to Rome and "to the governors in the provinces" reported by Philodemus testify to the philosopher's prestige at this time, when he was at the height of his fame, and Strabo, in describing Ascalon, mentions his birth there as a mark of distinction for the city. and Cicero frequently speaks of him in affectionate and respectful terms as the best and wisest of the Academics, and the most polished and acute philosopher of his age.

When Antiochus' friend and patron Lucullus undertook a campaign to Armenia in the year 69 in the Third Mithridatic War, he accompanied him and was present at the battle of Tigranokerta against the troops of the Armenian king Tigranes II on October 6, 69. Regarding the course of the battle, Antiochus remarked that the sun had never seen such a battle; Tigranes suffered a catastrophic defeat; only five men were said to have fallen on the Roman side. In the following year, Antiochus died in Syria, where he had accompanied Lucullus on another campaign.

== Philosophy ==
While Antiochus staunchly espoused skepticism during the time he belonged to the school of Philo, after his departure and break with Philo, he fought skeptical philosophy as fiercely as he had previously defended it. All of Antiochus' writings are lost, but his philosophical doctrines can be reconstructed from the philosophical writings of Cicero, especially the Lucullus, which discusses his epistemology, and the De Finibus, which discusses ethics. In addition, there are individual statements by the Pyrrhonist skeptic Sextus Empiricus, who also transmits an Antiochus fragment quoted verbatim. It is unclear to what extent Sextus' further doxographical explanations on epistemology are based on a lost writing by Antiochus. Augustine also commented on Antiochus' philosophy, based on his reading of Varro's writings About Philosophy, which have also since been lost. All of the surviving details of Antiochus' teaching relate to the second, anti-skeptical phase.

=== Platonism ===
Although he did not take up many central doctrines of Platonism, Antiochus did not see himself as an innovator who presented his own insights, but as a faithful herald of the Platonic tradition.

He saw the Stoics and the Peripatetics as being in fundamentally in agreement with Platonism; all three schools proclaimed the same truths, they just presented that truth differently. Antiochus presents himself as the intellectual heir of all three traditions and makes appeals to the "ancients"; among his authorities are not only the scholars of the older academy, but also Aristotle. However, the skepticism introduced by Arcesilaus turned away from this consensus based in truth, and the Peripatetic school had also lost their way after Aristotle in their excessive focus on natural philosophy; only the Stoics had been able to preserve any of the original authentic teachings of Platonism, the apparent differences had simply been attempts to correct some details. In epistemology, the Stoics are in fact the defenders of Platonism against Plato's own apostate school, the skeptics of the New Academy. In ethics, however, Antiochus says the Stoics stole the teachings of the Old Academy and covered it up by introducing deviant, inappropriate terminology.

Like most Ancient Greek philosophers, Antiochus divided philosophy into three branches: Logic, Physics, and Ethics. Of these, he considered ethics to be the most important branch of philosophy, as it answered the question of how to live in the right way. In second place he considered logic, especially epistemology, as a means of grasping truths on these matters. He classifies Physics, or Natural philosophy, as the least important. What he criticizes about it is that it deals with obscure, difficult questions, the clarification of which is far less important than the question of how best to live.

=== Epistemology ===
In epistemology, Antiochus attacks the position of the skeptics, according to which all statements - especially all philosophical teachings - are only opinions, the correctness of which can at best be made plausible, but never conclusively proven. Antiochus believed that there is knowledge whose absolute reliability follows from the fact that the possibility of error can be logically excluded, a "knowledge-imparting idea" (katalēptikḗ phantasía), which enables secure knowledge. This katalepsis – a Stoic technical term – is characterized by the fact that its correctness is unquestionable because no wrong idea is conceivable that could produce the same impression as the correct one, therefore, there can be no doubt as to the correctness of the insight into reality gained in this way. For Antiochus, as for the Stoics, this is the criterion of truth. In his argument with Philo, he sees this criterion as an indispensable prerequisite for a meaningful distinction between the true and the false. Unlike the Stoics, however, Antiochus only allows general concepts to be true, while the Stoics also considered individual sense perceptions to be true.

Antiochus distinguishes between the sensible, which is subject to constant change, and the intelligible, which is always unchanging. According to his teaching, since sense data only concern changeable things, they cannot by themselves provide access to truth, but only produce opinions; the knowledge of truth is an achievement of the intellect in dealing with the concepts, which have the property of remaining and persevering. This distinction is reminiscent of Plato's division between the world of appearances and the world of ideas. It is not meant in this sense, however, because Antiochus does not ascribe an ontologically independent existence to the unchangeable. Plato mistrusted the senses, since their objects were only inadequate images of archetypes (ideas), and assumed an independent world of ideas that one could and should turn to directly. For Antiochus, however, the intelligible does not exist in a separate intelligible world, but only in the form of general concepts and the conclusions drawn from them, insofar as these exist in the mind. This unplatonic teaching of Antiochus greatly enhances the role of sensory perception compared to Platonism. The intellect, which evaluates and orders the impressions conveyed by the sense organs, is itself a sense in Antiochus' materialistic world view. The universal is derived by the mind exclusively from the sense impressions - it cannot be deduced otherwise - and has meaning only through its connection with them.

Against the skeptics' assertion that nothing can be known with certainty, Antiochus raises the objection that such a fundamental doubt cannot - as Arcesilaus and Carneades had claimed - also refer to itself. Rather, the skeptics are forced, inconsistently, to make a truth claim for their own principle. In addition, there is a contradiction in the fact that the skeptics on the one hand assume the actual existence of objectively true or false ideas and on the other hand deny that a distinction between true and false is possible. Furthermore, Antiochus claims that the skeptical attitude cannot be implemented in everyday life, since it leaves the skeptical philosopher with no criterion according to which he can make reasonable decisions and thus condemns him to inactivity. A further argument refers to the empirical success that can be achieved by acting on the basis of a correct, knowledge-providing idea; this success presupposes a connection between the idea and reality, which is not given in the case of a deceptive idea.

=== Ethics ===
For Antiochus, the highest good and the purpose (telos) of life is to "live according to nature". As Antiochus notes, historically correctly, this concept was taught by the Old Academy Platonists, and the Stoics adopted it from the academy. However, the concept of nature underwent a change of meaning in the Stoa. For the Stoics, human reason was regarded as a manifestation of the divine logos directing the cosmos from within; human nature was significant only insofar as it was an expression of the general nature of the cosmos. Therefore, in the Stoic system of values, only the spiritual goods, the virtues that make a reasonable life possible, were given their own value. For Antiochus, however, the model for human nature cannot be universal nature, but only human-specific nature in its particularity. He relates the ideal of what is natural to the specifically human nature in its perfection, when it has reached a state in which it lacks nothing. In doing so, he aims to include the human body.

==== Physical goods ====
Antiochus accuses the Stoics of having distanced themselves from nature by disregarding physical goods (such as health, strength and beauty). Since man consists of body and soul, one cannot simply give up the body. Rather, human nature should be brought to perfection in every respect, including on the physical level. Therefore, physical goods should not be denied any intrinsic value. In the physical realm, too, there is something in accordance with nature that is worth striving for its own sake and even contributes to the attainment of the highest goal, the perfect natural life. Antiochus even speaks of bodily "virtues" in the sense of desirable states of perfection of the body. By this he not only means that the individual organs are healthy and fulfill their tasks without problems, He considered virtue to include not only positive character traits, but generally desired, natural qualities, such as natural posture and graceful gait.

==== External goods ====
In addition, external goods such as friends, relatives and the fatherland, even wealth, honor and power, are valuable and worth striving for. However, external goods, in contrast to mental and physical goods, are not absolutely necessary for a perfect life according to human nature. However, this does not devalue and render superfluous the equally legitimate striving for physical and external goods. Virtue (of character) is not the only good thing in people.

==== Mental goods ====
In the case of intellectual virtues, Antiochus distinguishes between those that are bestowed by nature and “arise of their own accord”, such as quick comprehension and memory, and “voluntary”, which are due to the activity of reason. The voluntary virtues—the cardinal virtues of prudence, sophrosyne, courage, and justice—are acquired after one has chosen them. Their acquisition is at all times in the power of the individual. They alone are necessary for the attainment of happiness, and they are also sufficient prerequisites for it. Therefore, a happy life is possible at any time by one's own decision; physical and external obstacles and evils cannot prevent it.

It is true that the spiritual goods, namely the virtues, have priority and that a virtuous character alone is sufficient to achieve eudaimonia (happiness). However, Antiochus does not share the radical view of those who deny that physical and external goods have any influence on the happiness of a wise man. Although he believes that the cardinal virtues are sufficient for a happy life, he sees physical and external goods as additional reinforcing factors that can increase happiness even further. This makes a perfectly happy life (Latin vita beatissima) possible, while the mental and spiritual virtues alone can only guarantee a happy life (vita beata).

==== Hierarchy of virtues ====
Antiochus emphasizes that the development of the individual, which leads to the perfection of his human nature, takes place gradually, with the later building on the earlier. The stages of development are hierarchically ordered according to the teachings of Antiochus. Progress is not a replacement of the lower by the higher, but an addition of the higher to the lower. The course of a human life leads from the initial instinctive striving for self-preservation, which is common to all living beings, to the perception and use of one's own abilities and abilities, a stage of development intended for humans and animals, but not for plants. Finally - in the best case - progress leads to self-knowledge with regard to what is specifically human, the realization of which is demanded by human nature. The possibility of such reflection on what is in accordance with nature is placed in man by nature like a seed. It is then up to him to implement this system.

As a rule, people strive for what is in accordance with nature and therefore valuable. If there are errors and ethical conflicts, this is due to the fact that the hierarchical order of goods is not being observed, and a lower value is being preferred over a higher one. Antiochus therefore rejects one-sidedness with regard to the question of the best way of life. The ideal is neither the active life of non-philosophers (Greek bíos praktikós, Latin vita activa) geared towards external success, nor the tranquil, withdrawn life of some philosophers (bíos theōrētikós, vita contemplativa), but rather a combination of both forms of life.

=== Natural philosophy ===
Antiochus' stoic background is very clearly noticeable in the natural sciences. In agreement with the Stoics, Antiochus holds matter to be infinitely divisible, contradicting the opinion of the Atomists and Epicureans.

He assumes two first principles of all reality, an efficient cause and the matter that presents itself to and is fashioned by the force. According to Stoic terminology, Antiochus also called the efficient cause "quality" (Greek poiótēs, Latin qualitas). Theoretically, the primordial matter is featureless, completely unformed and therefore suitable for receiving any form. Matter receives its diverse, constantly changing forms from the efficient cause. The efficient cause and matter belong together by nature, each of the two is contained in the other. Without matter there can be no efficient cause, as the efficient cause is unthinkable outside of matter, and matter needs the efficient cause that holds it together.

Since active force and matter cannot exist independently of one another, the featureless primordial matter does not really exist for Antiochus; the two original principles can only be separated in the act of thinking, not in reality. Since nothing exists apart from the two principles and everything that exists is necessarily spatial, there is no being independent of physical existence for Antiochus, in contradiction of Plato's theory of forms, which considered ideas as independent, transcendent archetypes of sense objects. The inseparability of the connection between efficient cause and matter also means that the soul itself as material, because the existence of matter determines that of efficient cause.

== Works ==
Antiochus wrote several works, none of which have survived. A clear presentation of the material that met the needs of the audience was important to Antiochus. His criticism of an artificial philosophical jargon that can only be understood with the help of an interpreter shows that he placed great value on general understanding.

According to Cicero, when Antiochus was still a student of Philo, he wrote treatises in which he represented skepticism "extremely astutely". Cicero mentions an epistemological treatise called Sosus, which was written around 86 BC, which was Antiochus' reply to the Roman books of Philo. The stoic Sosos, after whom the dialogue is named, apparently appeared as an important participant in the conversation. Around 78 BC Antiochus wrote a treatise in which he presented his view that there is agreement between the Stoa and the Peripatetics, the school of Aristotle, with regard to the doctrinal content and the differences can be reduced to questions of formulation. In the last year of his life, he wrote a treatise entitled "On the Gods." Another of his works, called Canonica, is quoted by Sextus Empiricus, and appears to have been a treatise on logic.

Cicero knows the works of Antiochus and extracts from them ideas that he reproduces in three of his philosophical writings (De finibus, Lucullus, Academica posteriora). Although he names Antiochus as the originator of the body of thought, he never gives a specific written source. A number of attempts to attribute larger text passages in these and other works of Cicero and in the writings of other authors to Antiochus, although his name is not mentioned there, remains hypothetical.

== Legacy ==
=== Ancient ===
Antiochus was called the founder of the "fifth Academy," in the same way that Philo was called the founder of the fourth. This split occurred just before the First Mithridatic War began in 88, which would lead to the destruction of the academy in 86. During this time, Antiochus was resident in Alexandria. He had returned to Athens by the time Cicero studied there in 79, and he seems to have died around 68, after which time his brother Aristus of Ascalon succeeded him as head of the school. Apparently he hardly deviated from the teaching of Antiochus. With his death, Antiochus' "Old Academy" seems to have perished as an institution; in any case, nothing is known of other scholars.

The aftermath of Antiochus' philosophy in antiquity was largely due to his significant influence on his two very prominent Roman disciples, Cicero and Varro. He also indirectly influenced the republican politician Marcus Junius Brutus, who played an important role in the assassination of Caesar and the civil war that followed. Brutus was a student and friend of Aristos and an admirer of Antiochus, but did not know him personally. He wrote several philosophical works. In his treatise On Virtue, which is lost today, he followed closely the ethics of Antiochus. Although Cicero does not agree with Antiochus' criticism of skepticism, he paints a very positive picture of his personality. He praises his exceptional talent and education, his intelligence, his gentle, peaceful character and the persuasiveness of his demeanor. His nickname "the swan" (kýknos), which the late antique scholar Stephanos of Byzantium has handed down, probably referred to the rhetorical skills of the philosopher. Opponents of Antiochus insinuated that his motive for breaking with academic skepticism and founding his own school was lust for fame. Cicero and Plutarch mention such accusations.

On the other hand, judgments in the Roman Empire were unfavorable. Plutarch indicated his disapproval only indirectly. The Middle Platonist Numenius of Apamea disliked Antiochus' proximity to the Stoa; he censured the introduction of numerous "foreign" (incompatible with Platonism) elements. The skeptic Sextus Empiricus, a representative of Pyrrhonic skepticism, held Antiochus for a Stoic who brought Stoic philosophy to the academy and taught it there. Augustine was particularly harsh when he referred to the rumors that Antiochus was motivated more by lust for glory than love of truth, who accomplished nothing of substance and polluted Platonism with stoic evil; the materialistic aspect of Antiochus' teaching could only meet with the sharpest opposition in Christian circles.

=== Modern ===
In the 19th and early 20th centuries, many scholars emphasized the unplatonic aspects of Antiochus' teaching. His perceived eclecticism, or mixing of different philosophical traditions, which they believed took place without understanding the peculiarities of the sometimes incompatible teachings, aroused offense. Theodor Mommsen thought that Antiochus had a malformed doctrine by combining Stoic ideas with together with Platonic-Aristotelian ones. Ulrich von Wilamowitz-Moellendorff judged that Antiochus had "trimmed a doctrine that met the needs and feelings of the so-called educated, because it avoided all sharp dialectics and seemed to retain everything that was good and beautiful." Eduard Zeller also shared this assessment.

Since the late 20th century, however, more positive assessments have prevailed. Jonathan Barnes considers Antiochus' return to the past to be understandable, since it drew attention to the achievements of important predecessors at a time when the schools of philosophy were in decline. Woldemar Görler also came to a relatively favorable assessment; in his view, Antiochus' philosophy is "not a vague compromise" but "self-contained." The founder of the "Old Academy" did not reinterpret Plato's teachings in the Stoic sense and blur the serious differences between the schools out of dishonesty, but because metaphysical thinking was foreign to him; his syncretism is an expression of a tendency of the zeitgeist of the time. Thus, regardless of his position as head of a "Platonic" school, he had in fact become almost a pure Stoic. John Dillon also considers Antiochus' thinking to be coherent. According to Mauro Bonazzi, Antiochus was by no means a "platonic Stoic". Rather, he skilfully pursued his strategy: he did not want to merge Platonism and Stoa, but subordinate the Stoic teachings to Platonism and incorporate them into it.

== Ancient sources ==
- Cicero, Lucullus, Book II of the Academica
- Cicero, De finibus bonorum et malorum
- Philodemus, History of the Academy
- Plutarch, Life of Cicero
- Plutarch, Life of Lucullus
- Sextus Empiricus, Outlines of Pyrrhonism
- Sextus Empiricus, Against the Logicians
