= Clitomachus (philosopher) =

2nd-century BC Greek academic skeptic philosopher

- Κλειτόμαχος
- Born: Hasdrubal (Ἀσδρούβας) c. 186 B.C. Carthage
- Died: c. 110 B.C. Athens

Philosophical work
- School: Academic skepticism
- Institutions: Academy (scholarch)

Clitomachus or Cleitomachus (Ancient Greek: Κλειτόμαχος, Kleitómakhos; 187/6–110/9 BC) was a Greek philosopher, originally from Carthage, who came to Athens in 163/2 BC (Note: Tiziano Dorandi (1999) however, writes that he "had reached his fortieth year when he went to Athens", but this is, according to Woldemar Görler (1994), not trustworthy.) and studied philosophy under Carneades. He became head of the Academy around 127/6 BC. He was an Academic skeptic like his master. Nothing survives of his writings, which were dedicated to making known the views of Carneades, but Cicero made use of them for some of his works.

== Life ==
Clitomachus was born in Carthage in 187/6 BC as Hasdrubal (Ancient Greek: Ἀσδρούβας, Hasdroúbas; Punic: 𐤏𐤆𐤓𐤁𐤏𐤋, ʿAzrubaʿal, "Help of Baal"). He came to Athens in 163/2 BC, when he was about 24 years old. There he became connected with the founder of the New Academy, the philosopher Carneades, under whose guidance he rose to be one of the most distinguished disciples of this school; but he also studied at the same time the philosophy of the Stoics and Peripatetics. In 127/6 BC, two years after the death of Carneades, he became the effective head (scholarch) of the Academy. He continued to teach at Athens till as late as 111 BC, as Crassus heard him in that year. He died in 110/09 BC, and was succeeded as scholarch by Philo of Larissa.

== Writings ==
Of his works, which amounted to 400 scrolls only a few of the names of the titles are preserved and not the actual writings. What we know of their ideas come primarily via interpretations by Cicero and Sextus Empiricus who did have access to them in their day.

Clitomachus' main object in writing them was to make known the philosophy of his master Carneades, from whose views he never dissented. Clitomachus continued to reside at Athens till the end of his life; but he continued to cherish a strong affection for his native country, and when Carthage was captured and destroyed in 146 BC, he wrote a work to console his unfortunate countrymen. This work, which Cicero says he had read, was taken from a discourse of Carneades, and was intended to exhibit the consolation which philosophy supplies even under the greatest calamities. His work was highly regarded by Cicero, who based parts of his De Natura Deorum, De Divinatione and De Fato on a work of Clitomachus he names as On the Withholding of Assent (Latin: De Sustinendis Adsensionibus).

Clitomachus probably treated the history of philosophy in his work on the philosophical sects: On the Schools of Thought (Greek: περί αἱρέσεων).

Two of Clitomachus' works are known to have been dedicated to prominent Romans, the poet Gaius Lucilius and the one-time consul Lucius Marcius Censorinus, suggesting that his work was known and appreciated in Rome.
