= Philo of Larissa =

Ancient Greek philosopher

- Φίλων ὁ Λαρισαῖος
- Born: c. 159 BC; Larissa
- Died: c. 84 BC; Rome

Philosophical work
- School: Academic skepticism
- Institutions: Academy (scholarch)

Philo of Larissa (Greek: Φίλων ὁ Λαρισαῖος Philon ho Larisaios; 159/8–84/3 BC) was a Greek philosopher. It is very probable that his actual name was "Philio."

He was a pupil of Clitomachus, whom he succeeded as head of the Academy. During the Mithridatic Wars which would see the destruction of the Academy, he travelled to Rome where Cicero heard him lecture. None of his writings survive. He was an Academic sceptic, like Clitomachus and Carneades before him, but he offered a more moderate view of skepticism than that of his teachers, permitting provisional beliefs without certainty.

== Life ==
Philo was born in Larissa in 154/3 BC. He moved to Athens where he became a pupil of Clitomachus, whom he succeeded as head of the Third or New Academy in 110–109 BC. According to Sextus Empiricus, he was the founder of a "Fourth Academy", but other writers refuse to admit the separate existence of more than three academies. He was the teacher of Antiochus of Ascalon who would become his adversary in the Platonist school.

During the Mithridatic wars Philo left Athens and took up his residence in Rome in 88 BC. In Rome he lectured on rhetoric and philosophy, and collected around him many eminent pupils, amongst whom Cicero was the most famous and the most enthusiastic.

Philo was the last undisputed scholarch of the Academy in direct succession from Plato. After his death in 84/3 BC, the Academy seceded into rivalling factions and eventually disappeared until the Neoplatonist revival.

== Philosophy ==
None of Philo's works are extant; our knowledge of his views is derived from Numenius, Sextus Empiricus and Cicero. In general, his philosophy was a reaction against the Academic skepticism of the Middle and New Academy in favor of the dogmatism of Plato.

He maintained that by means of conceptive notions (katalêptikê phantasia) objects could not be comprehended (akatalêpta), but were comprehensible according to their nature. How he understood the latter, whether he referred to the evidence and accordance of the sensations which we receive from things, or whether he had returned to the Platonic assumption of an immediate spiritual perception, is not clear. In opposition to his disciple Antiochus, he would not admit a separation of an Old and a New Academy, but would rather find the doubts of scepticism even in Socrates and Plato, and not less perhaps in the New Academy the recognition of truth which burst through its scepticism. At least on the one hand, even though he would not resist the evidence of the sensations, he wished even here to meet with antagonists who would endeavour to refute his positions i.e. he felt the need of subjecting afresh what he had provisionally set down in his own mind as true to the examination of scepticism; and on the other hand, he did not doubt of arriving at a sure conviction respecting the ultimate end of life.
