= Platonism =

Philosophical system

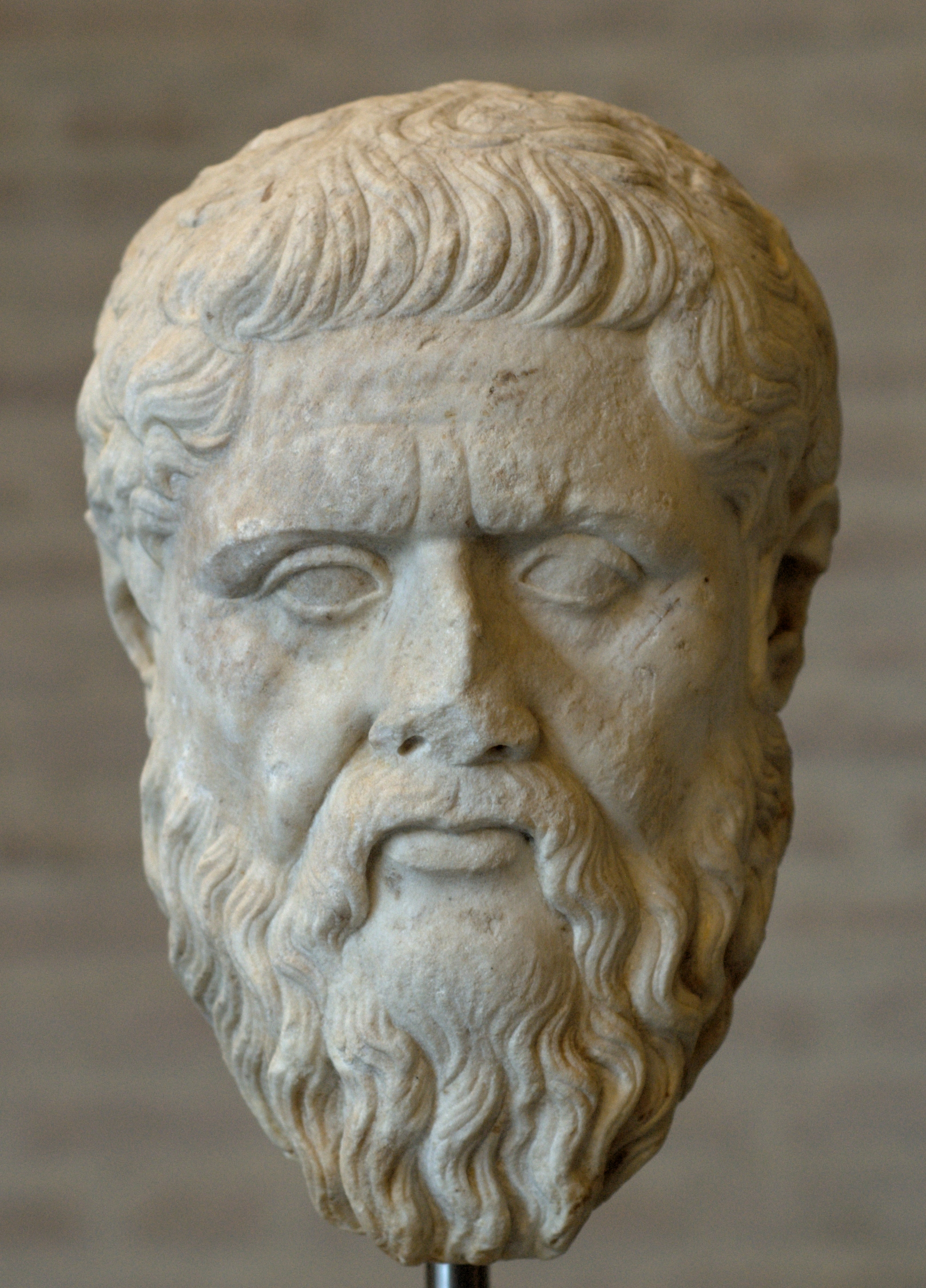
Head of Plato, Roman copy. The original was exhibited at the Academy after the death of the philosopher (348/347 BC).

Platonism is the philosophy of Plato and philosophical systems closely derived from it, considered the opposite of nominalism, or anti-realism. (Note: Later and contemporary Platonists do not necessarily accept all of Plato's own doctrines. (Note: "Philosophers who affirm the existence of abstract objects are sometimes called platonists; those who deny their existence are sometimes called nominalists. The terms 'platonism' and 'nominalism' have established senses in the history of philosophy, where they denote positions that have little to do with the modern notion of an abstract object. In this connection, it is essential to bear in mind that modern platonists (with a small 'p') need not accept any of the doctrines of Plato, just as modern nominalists need not accept the doctrines of medieval Nominalists.")) Platonism has had a profound influence on Western thought. Platonism or Platonic realism affirms the real existence of forms or abstract objects, originally to solve the problem of universals. Abstract objects are asserted to exist in a third realm distinct from both the sensible external world and from the internal world of consciousness. This can apply to properties, types, propositions, meanings, numbers, sets, truth values, and so on (see abstract object theory).

Plato's doctrine originally was an attempt to reconcile the reality which is perceptible but unintelligible, associated with the flux of Heraclitus and studied by the likes of physical science, and the reality which is imperceptible but intelligible, associated with the unchanging being of Parmenides and studied by the likes of mathematics. Geometry was one of Plato's main inspirations, which likely reflects the influence of Pythagoras. The Forms are typically described—in dialogues such as the Phaedo, Symposium and Republic—as perfect archetypes, of which objects in the everyday world are imperfect copies. (Note: In the Republic the highest form is identified as the Form of the Good (Greek: ἡ τοῦ ἀγαθοῦ ἰδέα, romanized: hê tou agatou idea, lit. 'idea of the good'), the source of all other Forms, which could be known by reason. In the Sophist, a later work, the Forms being, sameness and difference are listed among the primordial "Great Kinds".) The so-called "Third Man" argument, first articulated by Plato himself and later recast into the eponymous version by Aristotle, was the theory's most famous criticism in antiquity.

Plato established the Academy, and in the 3rd century BC, Arcesilaus adopted academic skepticism, which became a central tenet of the school until 90 BC when Antiochus added Stoic elements, rejected skepticism, and began a period known as Middle Platonism. In the 3rd century AD, Plotinus added additional mystical elements, establishing Neoplatonism, in which the summit of existence was the One or the Good, the source of all things; in virtue and meditation the soul had the power to elevate itself to attain union with the One.

Many Platonic notions were adopted by the Christian church which understood Plato's Forms as God's thoughts (a position also known as divine conceptualism), while Neoplatonism became a major influence on Christian mysticism in the West through Saint Augustine, Doctor of the Catholic Church, who was heavily influenced by Plotinus' Enneads, and in turn were foundations for the whole of Western Christian thought. Many ideas of Plato were incorporated by the Roman Catholic Church. Platonic ideas saw a further revival in the Renaissance and in contemporary analytic philosophy with the rise of mathematical platonism in modern philosophy of mathematics.

== Philosophy ==
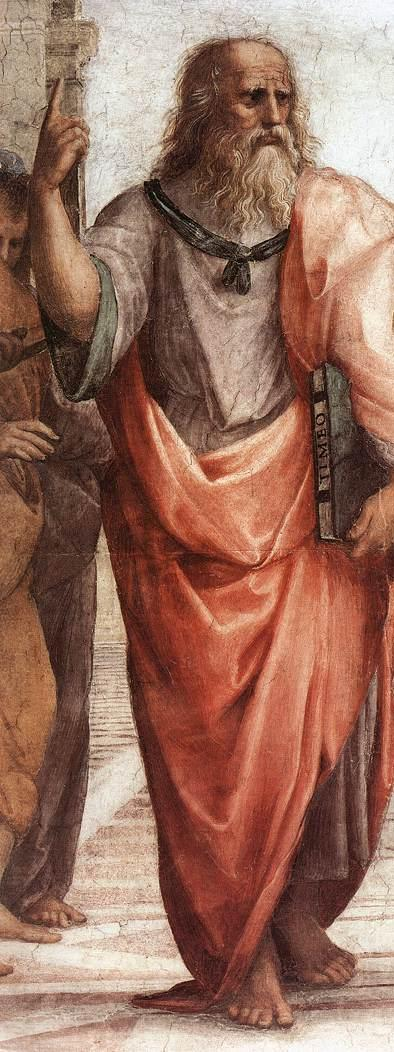
Plato holding his Timaeus, detail from the Vatican fresco The School of Athens

The primary concept is the Theory of Forms. True being is founded upon the Forms—eternal, unchangeable, perfect types, of which particular sensible objects are only imperfect realizations. Since these sensible particulars are (among other issues) subject to perpetual change, they are thereby unsuitable as a basis for genuine knowledge; (Note: An alternative reading of the relevant passages—e.g. Republic V (474b ff.)—would have Plato (or, at least, Plato's Socrates) asserting that sensible particulars rather have no genuine existence; this interpretation, however, is generally dismissed as untenable.) thus, it is the Forms that secure for us the possibility of obtaining such knowledge. Some interpret Plato as positing a Form corresponding to each and every (coherent) universal, kind, or property; others propose that Plato understood the range of Forms to be more restricted (e.g., that only "natural" kinds or properties partake of Forms, or that there are no Forms of negations).

The following excerpt may be representative of Plato's middle period metaphysics and epistemology:

[Socrates] "Since the beautiful is the opposite of the ugly, they are two."
[Glaucon] "Of course."
"And since they are two, each is one?"
"I grant that also."
"And the same account is true of the just and unjust, the good and the bad, and all the forms. Each of them is itself one, but because they manifest themselves everywhere in association with actions, bodies, and one another, each of them appears to be many."
"That's right."
"So, I draw this distinction: On one side are those you just now called lovers of sights, lovers of crafts, and practical people; on the other side are those we are now arguing about and whom one would alone call philosophers."
"How do you mean?"
"The lovers of sights and sounds like beautiful sounds, colors, shapes, and everything fashioned out of them, but their thought is unable to see and embrace the nature of the beautiful itself."
"That's for sure."
"In fact, there are very few people who would be able to reach the beautiful itself and see it by itself. Isn't that so?"
"Certainly."
"What about someone who believes in beautiful things, but doesn't believe in the beautiful itself and isn't able to follow anyone who could lead him to the knowledge of it? Don't you think he is living in a dream rather than a wakened state? Isn't this dreaming: whether asleep or awake, to think that a likeness is not a likeness but rather the thing itself that it is like?"
"I certainly think that someone who does that is dreaming."
"But someone who, to take the opposite case, believes in the beautiful itself, can see both it and the things that participate in it and doesn't believe that the participants are it or that it itself is the participants—is he living in a dream or is he awake?"
"He's very much awake."

(Republic Bk. V, 475e-476d, translation G. M. A. Grube)

Book VI of the Republic identifies the highest Form as the Form of the Good, the cause of all other Ideas, and that on which the being and knowing of all other Forms is contingent. Conceptions derived from the impressions of sense can never give us the knowledge of true being, i.e., of the Forms. It can only be obtained by the soul's activity within itself, apart from the troubles and disturbances of sense; that is to say, by the exercise of reason. Dialectic, as the instrument in this process, leading us to knowledge of the forms, and finally to the highest form of the Good, is the first of sciences. Later, Neoplatonism—beginning with Plotinus—identified the Good of the Republic with the transcendent, absolute One of the first hypothesis of the Parmenides (137c-142a).

A bust of Plato in Athens

Platonist ethics is based on the Form of the Good. Virtue is knowledge, the recognition of the supreme Form of the Good; and, since in this cognition the three parts of the soul—reason, spirit, and appetite—all have their share, we get the three virtues: Wisdom, Courage, and Moderation. The bond which unites the other virtues is the virtue of Justice, by which each part of the soul is confined to the performance of its proper function.

Platonism had a profound effect on Western thought. In many interpretations of the Timaeus Platonism, like Aristotelianism, poses an eternal universe, as opposed to the nearby Judaic tradition that the universe had been created in historical time, with its continuous history recorded. Unlike Aristotelianism, Platonism describes idea as prior to matter and identifies the person with the soul. Many Platonic notions secured a permanent place in Christianity.

At the heart of Plato's philosophy is the theory of the soul. Francis Cornford described the twin pillars of Platonism as being the theory of the Forms, on the one hand, and, on the other hand, the doctrine of the immortality of the soul.

== History ==
=== Ancient philosophy ===
==== The Academy ====
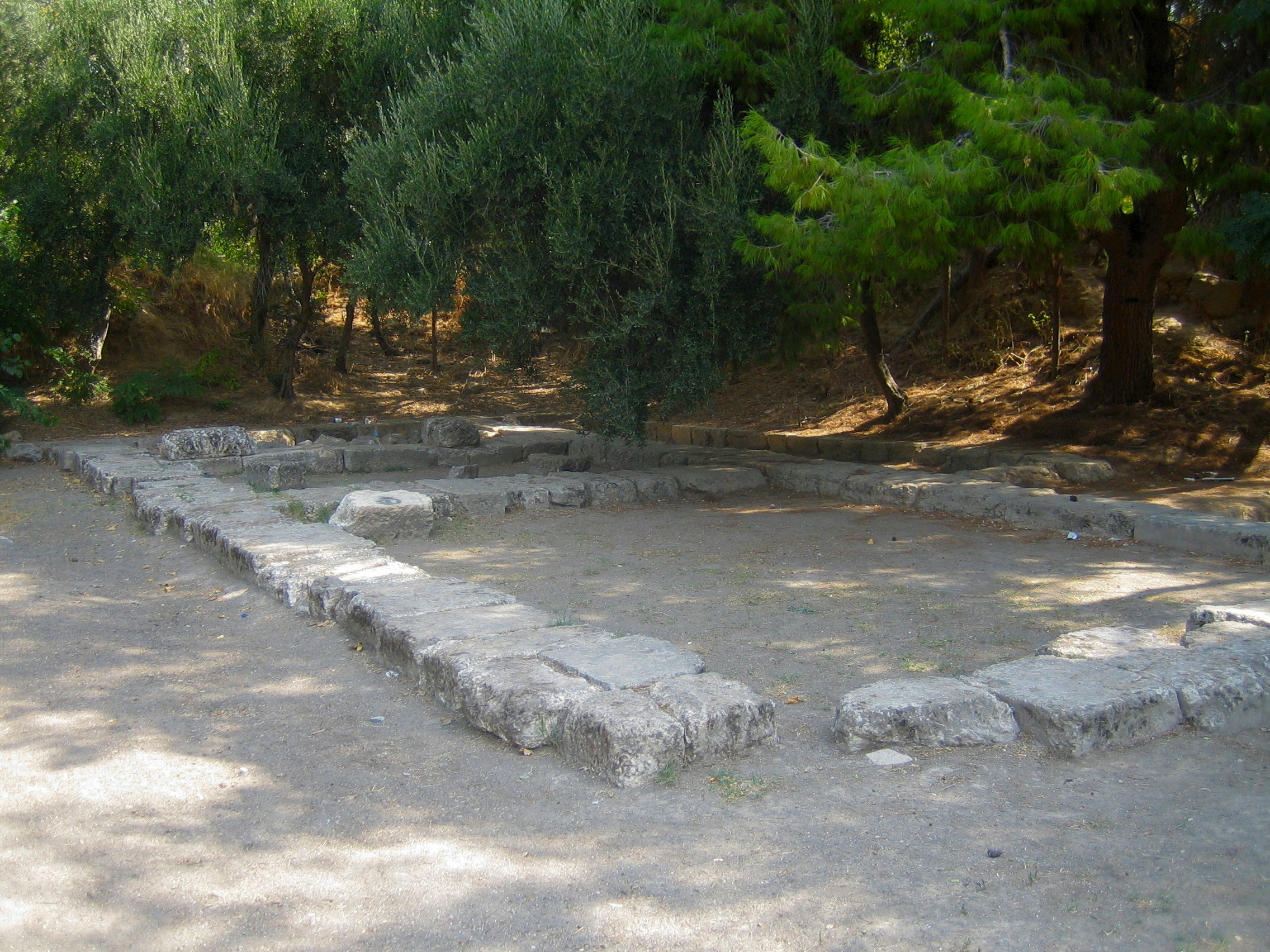
Site of Plato's Academy in Athens

Platonism was originally expressed in the dialogues of Plato, in which the figure of Socrates is used to expound certain doctrines, that may or may not be similar to the thought of the historical Socrates, Plato's master. Plato delivered his lectures at the Platonic Academy, a precinct containing a sacred grove outside the walls of Athens. The school continued there long after Plato's death. There were three periods: the Old, Middle, and New Academy. The chief figures in the Old Academy were Speusippus (Plato's nephew), who succeeded him as the head of the school (until 339 BC), and Xenocrates (until 313 BC). Both of them sought to fuse Pythagorean speculations on number with Plato's theory of forms.

==== The Skeptical Academy ====
Around 266 BC, Arcesilaus became head of the academy. This phase, known as the Middle Academy, strongly emphasized philosophical skepticism. It was characterized by its attacks on the Stoics and their assertion of the certainty of truth and our knowledge of it. The New Academy began with Carneades in 155 BC, the fourth head in succession from Arcesilaus. It was still largely skeptical, denying the possibility of knowing an absolute truth; both Arcesilaus and Carneades argued that they were maintaining a genuine tenet of Plato.

==== Middle Platonism ====
Around 90 BC, Antiochus of Ascalon rejected skepticism, making way for the period known as Middle Platonism, in which Platonism was fused with certain Peripatetic and many Stoic dogmas. In Middle Platonism, the Platonic Forms were not transcendent but immanent to rational minds, and the physical world was a living, ensouled being, the World-Soul. Pre-eminence in this period belongs to Plutarch. The eclectic nature of Platonism during this time is shown by its incorporation into Pythagoreanism (Numenius of Apamea) and into Jewish philosophy (Philo of Alexandria).

==== Neoplatonism ====
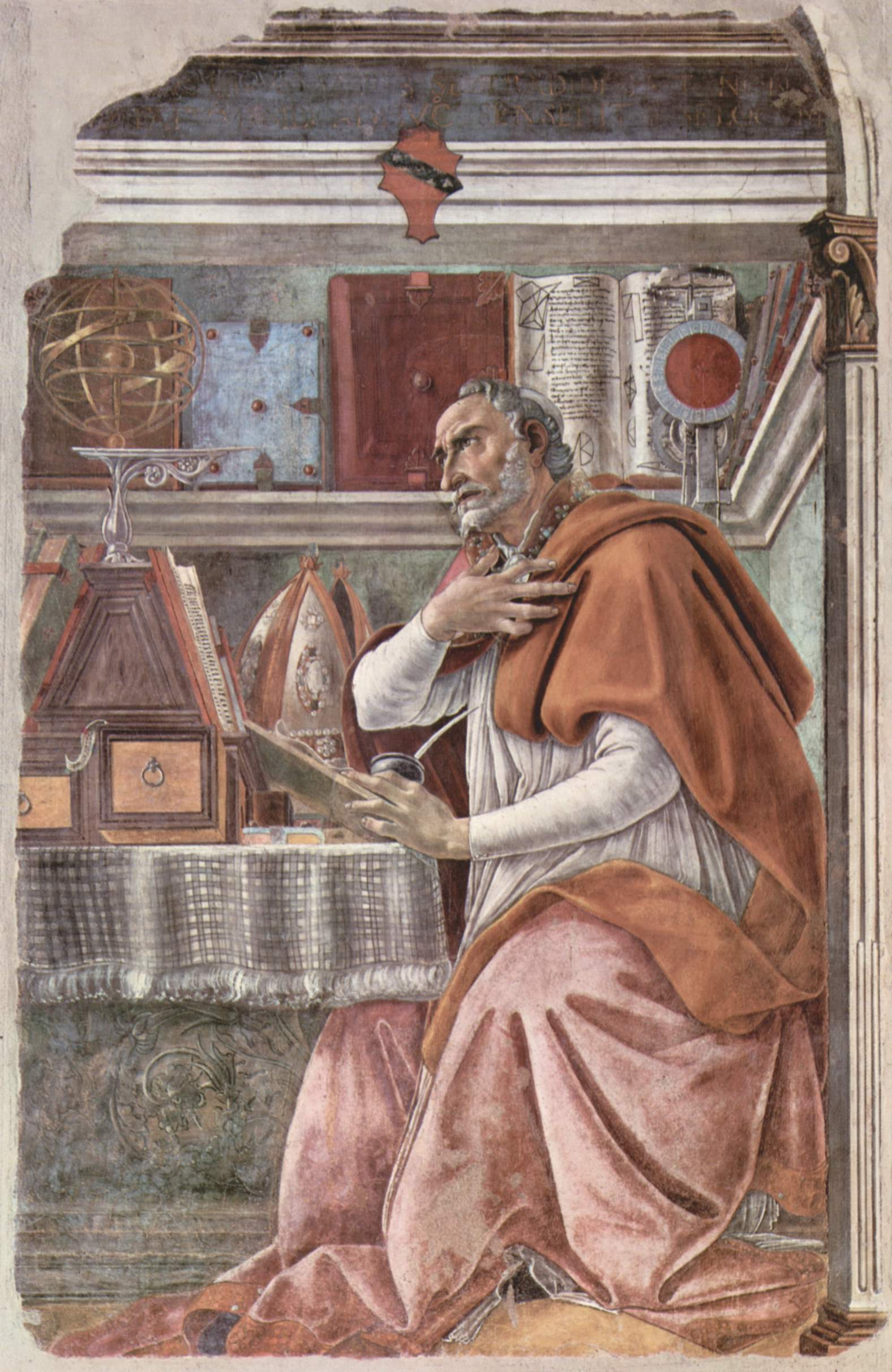
Many Western churchmen, including Augustine of Hippo, have been influenced by Platonism.

In the third century, Plotinus recast Plato's system, establishing Neoplatonism, in which Middle Platonism was fused with mysticism. At the summit of existence stands the One or the Good, as the source of all things. It generates from itself, as if from the reflection of its own being, reason, the nous, wherein is contained the infinite store of ideas. The world-soul, the copy of the nous, is generated by and contained in it, as the nous is in the One, and, by informing matter in itself nonexistent, constitutes bodies whose existence is contained in the world-soul. Nature therefore is a whole, endowed with life and soul. Soul, being chained to matter, longs to escape from the bondage of the body and return to its original source. In virtue and philosophical thought it has the power to elevate itself above the reason into a state of ecstasy, where it can behold, or ascend to, that one good primary Being whom reason cannot know. To attain this union with the Good, or the One is the true function of human beings.

Plotinus' disciple, Porphyry, followed by Iamblichus, developed the system in conscious opposition to Christianity—even as many influential early Christian writers took inspiration from it in their conceptions of monotheistic theology. The Platonic Academy was re-established during this period; its most renowned head was Proclus (died 485), a celebrated commentator on Plato's writings. The academy persisted until Roman emperor Justinian closed it in 529.

=== Medieval philosophy ===
==== Christianity and Platonism ====
Neoplatonism has had some influence on Christianity through Clement of Alexandria and Origen, and the Cappadocian Fathers. St. Augustine was heavily influenced by Platonism as well, which he encountered through the Latin translations of Marius Victorinus of the works of Porphyry and/or Plotinus.

Platonism was considered authoritative in the Middle Ages. Platonism also influenced both Eastern and Western mysticism. Meanwhile, Platonism influenced various philosophers such as at the School of Chartres. While Aristotle became more influential than Plato in the 13th century, St. Thomas Aquinas's philosophy was still in certain respects fundamentally Platonic.

=== Modern philosophy ===
==== Renaissance ====
The Renaissance also saw a renewed interest in Platonic thought, including more interest in Plato himself. Marsilio Ficino's Florentine Academy was an attempt to revive Plato's Academy. Members included Giovanni Pico della Mirandolla.

In 16th-, 17th-, and 19th-century England, Plato's ideas influenced many religious thinkers including the Cambridge Platonists. Orthodox Protestantism in continental Europe, however, distrusts natural reason and has often been critical of Platonism. An issue in the reception of Plato in early modern Europe was how to deal with the same-sex elements of his corpus.

Christoplatonism is a term used to refer to a dualism opined by Plato, which holds spirit is good but matter is evil, which influenced some Christian churches, though the Bible's teaching directly contradicts this philosophy and thus it receives constant criticism from many teachers in the Christian Church today. According to the Methodist Church, Christoplatonism directly "contradicts the Biblical record of God calling everything He created good."

=== Contemporary philosophy ===
==== Modern Platonism ====
Apart from historical Platonism originating from thinkers such as Plato and Plotinus, we also encounter the theory of abstract objects in the modern sense.

Platonism is the view that there exist such things as abstract objects — where an abstract object is an object that does not exist in space or time and which is therefore entirely non-physical and non-mental. Platonism in this sense is a contemporary view.

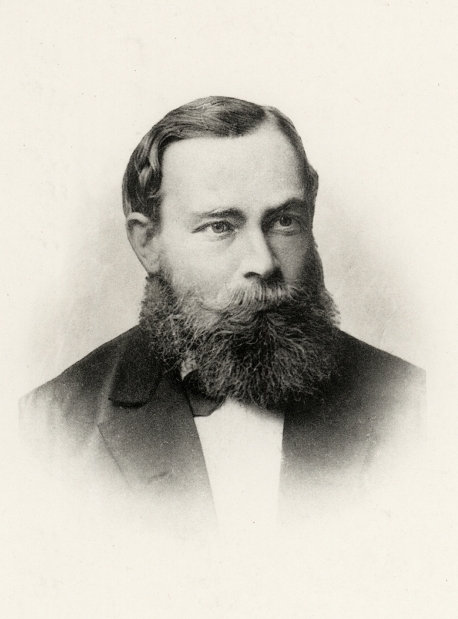
Most contemporary Platonists trace their views to those of Gottlob Frege.

This modern Platonism has been endorsed in one way or another at one time or another by numerous philosophers, such as Bernard Bolzano, who argue for anti-psychologism. Plato's works have been decisively influential for 20th century philosophers such as Alfred North Whitehead and his Process Philosophy; and for the critical realism and metaphysics of Nicolai Hartmann.

===== Analytic =====
In contemporary philosophy, most Platonists trace their ideas to Gottlob Frege's influential paper "Thought", which argues for Platonism with respect to propositions, and his influential book, The Foundations of Arithmetic, which argues for Platonism with respect to numbers and is a seminal text of the logicist project. Contemporary analytic philosophers who espoused Platonism in metaphysics include Bertrand Russell, Alonzo Church, Kurt Gödel, W. V. O. Quine, David Kaplan, Saul Kripke, Edward Zalta, John McDowell, and Peter van Inwagen. Iris Murdoch espoused Platonism in moral philosophy in her 1970 book The Sovereignty of Good.

Paul Benacerraf's epistemological challenge to contemporary Platonism has proved its most influential criticism.

===== Continental =====
In contemporary Continental philosophy, Edmund Husserl's arguments against psychologism are believed to derive from a Platonist conception of logic, influenced by Frege and his mentor Bolzano. Husserl explicitly mentioned Bolzano, G. W. Leibniz and Hermann Lotze as inspirations for his position in his Logical Investigations (1900–1). Other prominent contemporary Continental philosophers interested in Platonism in a general sense include Leo Strauss, Simone Weil, and Alain Badiou.

== Influence on religions ==
Platonism has not only influenced the tenets of Christianity and Islam that are today classified as 'orthodox' teachings, but also the gnostic or esoteric 'heterodox' traditions of these religions that circulated in the ancient world, such as the former major world religion Manichaeism, Mandaeism, and Hermeticism. Through European Renaissance scholarship on Hermeticism and direct Platonic philosophy (among other esoteric and philosophical scholarship of the time, such as Jewish magic and mysticism and Islamic alchemy), the magic and alchemy of the period represents a culmination of several permutations of Platonic philosophy.

Julius Evola incorporated Platonic metaphysics into his vision of Roman pagan revival, aligning with his Traditionalist critique of modernity. Arturo Reghini, an Italian esotericist and collaborator of Evola, also promoted Neoplatonic ideas in his efforts to revive ancient Roman religion.

== See also ==
- Alchemy
- Hermeticism
- Innatism
- List of ancient Platonists
- Plato's unwritten doctrines, debates over Plato's esotericism
- World Soul

=== People ===
- Harold F. Cherniss, scholar of Plato's relation to Aristotle
