= Academic skepticism =

Skeptical period of ancient Academy

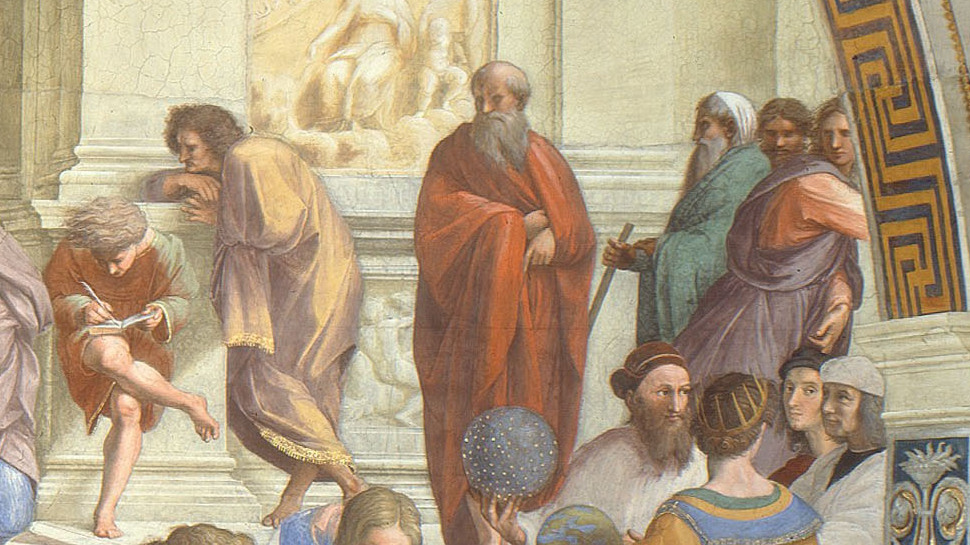
Six of the skeptics standing together in Raphael's painting The School of Athens. From left to right: Pythodorus, Arcesilaus of Pitane, Carneades of Cyrene, Pyrrho of Elis, Timon of Phlius, Theodorus the Atheist of Cyrene.

Academic skepticism was the philosophy of the skeptical period of the Academy dating from around 266 BC, when Arcesilaus became scholarch, until around 90 BC, when Antiochus of Ascalon rejected skepticism, although individual philosophers, such as Favorinus and his teacher Plutarch, continued to defend skepticism after this date. Unlike the existing school of skepticism, the Pyrrhonists, they maintained that knowledge of things is impossible. Ideas or notions are never true; nevertheless, there are degrees of plausibility, and hence degrees of belief, which allow one to act. The school was characterized by its attacks on the Stoics, particularly their dogma that convincing impressions led to true knowledge. The most important Academics were Arcesilaus, Carneades, and Philo of Larissa. The most extensive ancient source of information about Academic skepticism is Academica, written by the Academic skeptic philosopher Cicero.

== Overview ==
Greek philosophical skepticism, as a distinct philosophical movement, began with Pyrrho of Elis (c. 360 – c. 270 BC), with antecedents in Xenophanes and Democritus. His followers, the Pyrrhonists, pointed out the problem of the criterion: that our theories and our sense impressions are unable to accurately distinguish truth from falsehood; therefore we must suspend judgment (epoche). They were consistent enough to extend their doubt even to their own principle of doubt, making their skepticism universal, thus escaping reproach for basing it upon a fresh dogmatism. Mental imperturbability (ataraxia) was the result to be attained by cultivating such a frame of mind.

Around 266 BC, Arcesilaus became head of the Platonic Academy. He adopted skepticism as a central tenet of Platonism, making Platonism nearly the same as Pyrrhonism. After Arcesilaus, the Academics diverged from Pyrrhonism. This skeptical period of ancient Platonism, from Arcesilaus to Philo of Larissa, became known as the new Academy, although some ancient authors added further subdivisions, such as a middle Academy. Following the death of the Pyrrhonist Timon of Phlius, the Platonic Academy became the primary advocate of skepticism until the mid-first century BC. While early Academic skepticism was influenced in part by Pyrrho, it grew more and more dogmatic until Aenesidemus, in the first century BC, broke with the Academic skeptics and adopted Pyrrhonism, denouncing the Academy as "Stoics fighting against Stoics."

The Academics did not doubt the existence of truth; they just doubted that humans had the capacities for obtaining it. They based this position on Plato's Phaedo, in which Socrates discusses how knowledge is not accessible to mortals.

While the objective of the Pyrrhonists was the attainment of ataraxia, after Arcesilaus the Academics did not hold up ataraxia as the central objective. The Academics focused on criticizing the dogmas of other schools of philosophy, in particular of the dogmatism of the Stoics. They acknowledged some vestiges of a moral law within, at best merely a plausible guide, the possession of which, however, formed the real distinction between the sage and the fool. Slight as the difference may appear between the positions of the Academics and the Pyrrhonists, a comparison of their lives leads to the conclusion that a practical philosophical moderation was the characteristic of the Academics whereas the objectives of the Pyrrhonists were more psychological. The second-century Roman historian Aulus Gellius described the distinction between the Academic skeptics and the Pyrrhonists as follows:

"...the Academics apprehend (in some sense) the very fact that nothing can be apprehended, and they determine (in some sense) that nothing can be determined, whereas the Pyrrhonists assert that not even that seems to be true, since nothing seems to be true."

== Arcesilaus ==
Up to Arcesilaus, the Platonic Academy accepted the principle of finding a general unity in all things, by the aid of which a principle of certainty might be found. Arcesilaus, however, broke new ground by attacking the very possibility of certainty and denied the possibility of even the Socratic minimum of certainty: "I cannot know even whether I know or not."

The doctrines of Arcesilaus, which must be gathered from the writings of others, represent an attack on the Stoic phantasia kataleptike (criterion) and are based on the skepticism which was latent in the later writings of Plato. Arcesilaus held that strength of intellectual conviction cannot be regarded as valid, inasmuch as it is characteristic equally of contradictory convictions. The uncertainty of sense data applies equally to the conclusions of reason, and therefore man must be content with probability which is sufficient as a practical guide. "We know nothing, not even our ignorance"; therefore the wise man will be content with an agnostic attitude.

== Carneades ==
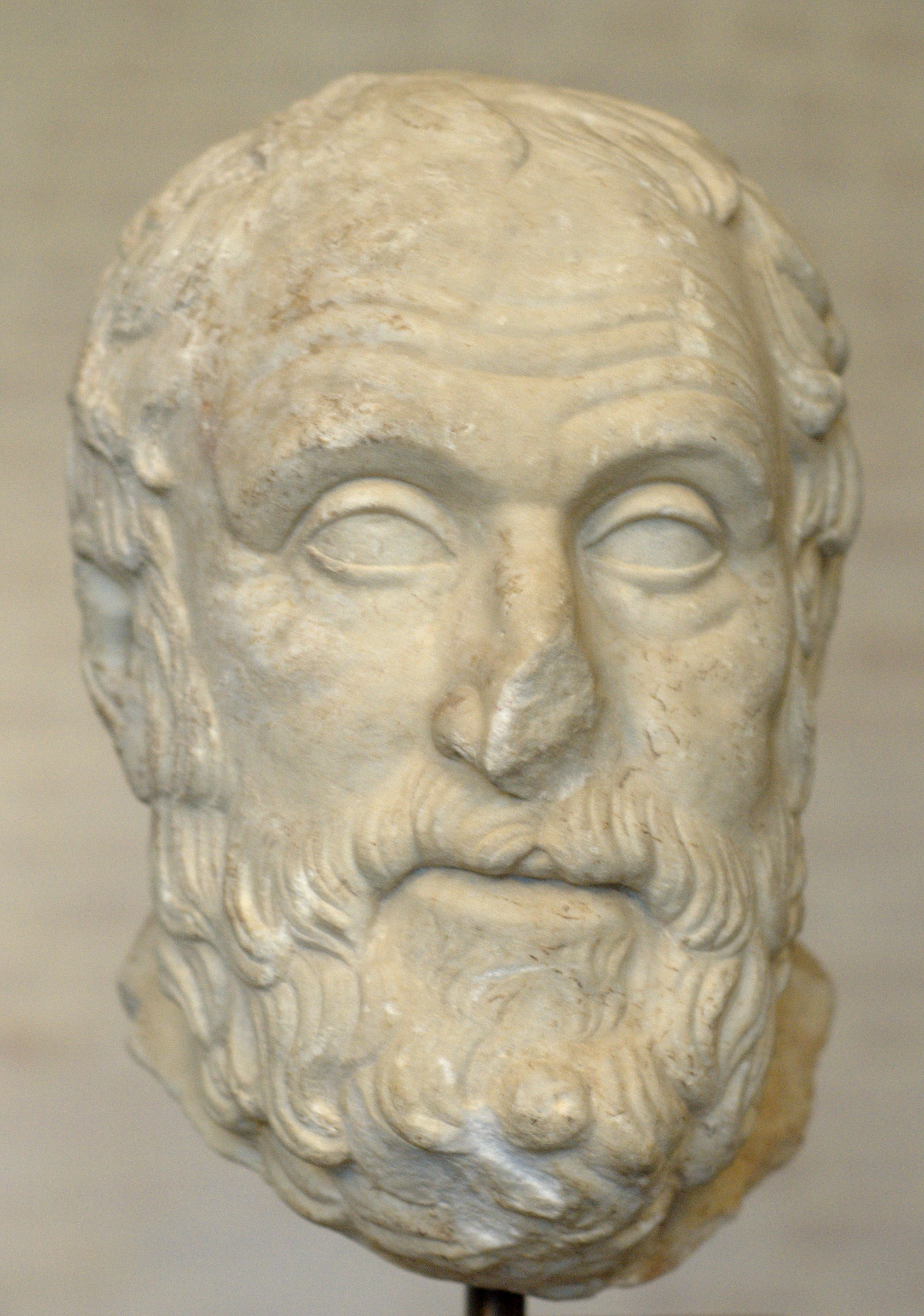
Carneades of Cyrene, the most important of the Academic skeptics

The next stage in Academic skepticism was the moderate skepticism of Carneades, which he said owed its existence to his opposition to Chrysippus.

To the Stoic theory of perception, the phantasia kataleptike, by which they expressed a conviction of certainty arising from impressions so strong as to amount to science, he proposed the doctrine of acatalepsia, which denied any necessary correspondence between perceptions and the objects perceived. All our sensations are relative, and acquaint us, not with things as they are, but only with the impressions that things produce upon us. Experience, he said, clearly shows that there is no true impression. There is no notion that may not deceive us; it is impossible to distinguish between false and true impressions; therefore the Stoic phantasia kataleptike must be given up. There is no phantasia kataleptike ("criterion") of truth. Carneades also assailed Stoic theology and physics. In answer to the doctrine of final cause, of design in nature, he pointed to those things which cause destruction and danger to man, to the evil committed by men endowed with reason, to the miserable condition of humanity, and to the misfortunes that assail the good man. There is, he concluded, no evidence for the doctrine of a divine superintending providence. Even if there were orderly connexion of parts in the universe, this may have resulted quite naturally. No proof can be advanced to show that this world is anything but the product of natural forces.

Knowledge being impossible, a wise man should practice epoche (suspension of judgment). He will not even be sure that he can be sure of nothing. He saved himself, however, from absolute skepticism by the doctrine of plausibility, which may serve as a practical guide in life. Ideas or notions are never true, but only plausible; nevertheless, there are degrees of plausibility, and hence degrees of belief, leading to action. According to Carneades, an impression may be plausible in itself; plausible and uncontradicted (not distracted by synchronous sensations, but shown to be in harmony with them) when compared with others; plausible, uncontradicted, and thoroughly investigated and confirmed. In the first degree there is a strong persuasion of the propriety of the impression made; the second and third degrees are produced by comparisons of the impression with others associated with it, and an analysis of itself. Carneades left no written works; his opinions seem to have been systematized by his pupil Clitomachus, whose works, which included one "on suspension of judgment", were made use of by Cicero.

== Philo of Larissa ==
In Philo of Larissa, we find a tendency not only to reconcile the internal divergences of the Academy itself, but also to connect it with parallel systems of thought. In general, his philosophy was a reaction against the skeptic or agnostic position of the middle and new Academy in favor of the dogmatism of Plato. Philo of Larissa endeavored to show that Carneades was not opposed to Plato, and further that the apparent antagonism between Platonism and Stoicism was because they were arguing from different points of view. From this syncretism emerged the eclectic middle Platonism of Antiochus of Ascalon, the last product of Academic development.

== See also ==
- Probabilism
- Scientific skepticism
