= Carneades =

Hellenistic skeptic philosopher (214/3 BC - 129/8 BC)

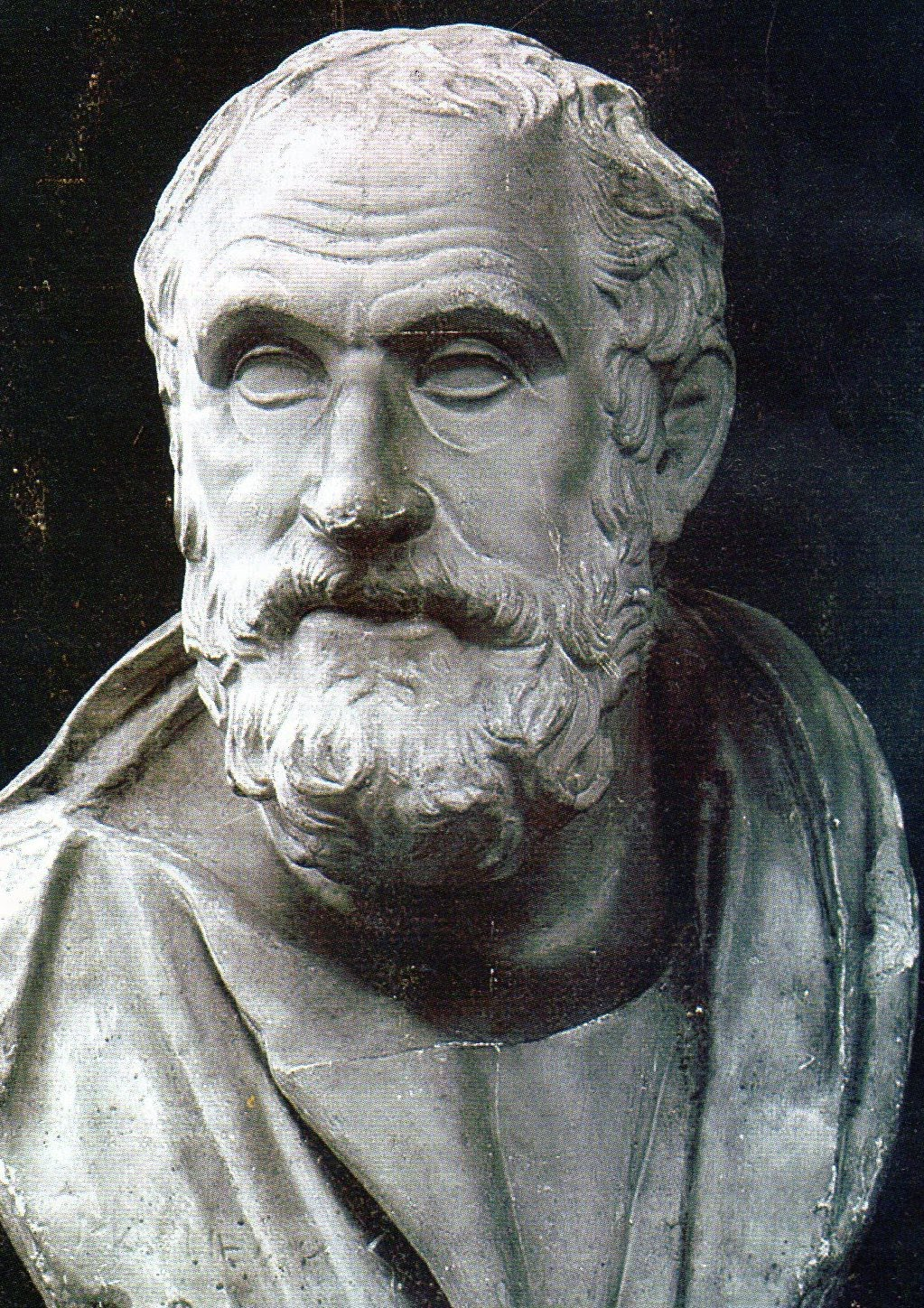
- Carneades, Cast of a copy after the statue exhibited on the agora of Athens, c. 150 BC, now lost
- Born: 214/213 BC; Cyrene
- Died: 129/128 BC; Athens

Philosophical work
- Era: Hellenistic philosophy
- Region: Western philosophy
- School: Academic skepticism, Platonism
- Main interests: Epistemology, ethics
- Notable ideas: Philosophical skepticism, probabilism, Plank of Carneades

Carneades (/kɑːrˈniːədiːz/; Greek: Καρνεάδης, Karneadēs, "of Carnea"; 214/3-129/8 BC) was a Greek philosopher, perhaps the most prominent head of the Skeptical Academy in Ancient Greece. He was born in Cyrene. By the time of his embassy to Rome in 155 BC, he was already a leading critic of dogmatic doctrines, especially those of Stoicism and the Epicureans, continuing the critical engagement that his predecessor Arcesilaus had also directed against both schools.

As scholarch (leader) of the Academy, he was one of three philosophers sent to Rome in 155 BC where his lectures on the uncertainty of justice caused consternation among leading politicians. He left no writings. His ideas were passed on to us through his successor Clitomachus whose own books were lost but relayed to us indirectly in the writings of Cicero and Sextus Empiricus. He seems to have doubted the ability not just of the senses but of reason too in acquiring truth. His skepticism was, however, moderated by the belief that we can, nevertheless, ascertain probabilities (not in the sense of statistical probability, but in the sense of persuasiveness) of truth, to enable us to act.

According to Douglas Walton, Carneades' most important contribution to philosophy was his theory of plausibility based on reasonable evidence. The 3 criteria, as relayed by Empiricus, for accepting an argument, even if tentatively, is that it should be presented in a convincing way, that it is consistent with other arguments put forward, and that it can be confirmed by testing. Walton argues that Carneades provided a pragmatic response to skepticism by asserting that reasonable grounds were sufficient for action and belief in daily life rather than absolute certainty.

== Biography ==
Carneades, the son of Epicomus or Philokomus, was born at Cyrene, North Africa in 214/213 BC. He migrated early to Athens. There he attended the lectures of the Stoics, learning their logic from Diogenes of Babylon and studying the works of Chrysippus. He subsequently focused his efforts on refuting the Stoics, attaching himself to the Platonic Academy, which had suffered from the attacks of the Stoics. On the death of Hegesinus of Pergamon, he was chosen scholarch (head) of the Academy. His great eloquence and skill in argument revived the glories of the Academic Skeptics. He asserted nothing (not even that nothing can be asserted), and carried on a vigorous argument against every dogma maintained by other sects.

In the year 155 BC, when he was fifty-eight years old, he was chosen with the Stoic Diogenes of Babylon and the Peripatetic Critolaus to go as ambassadors to Rome to deprecate the fine of 500 talents which had been imposed on the Athenians for the destruction of Oropus. During his stay at Rome, he attracted great notice from his eloquent speeches on philosophical subjects. It was here that, in the presence of Cato the Elder, he delivered his several orations on justice. The first oration was in commendation of the virtue of Roman justice. The next day he delivered the second oration, in which he refuted all the arguments he had made the day before. He persuasively attempted to prove that justice was inevitably problematic, and not a given when it came to virtue, but merely a compact device deemed necessary for the maintenance of a well-ordered society. This oration shocked Cato. Recognizing the potential danger of Carneades' arguments, Cato moved the Roman Senate to send Carneades back to Athens to prevent Roman youth from being exposed to a re-examining of Roman doctrines. Carneades lived twenty-seven years after this at Athens.

Due to Carneades' ill health, he was succeeded as scholarch by Polemarchus of Nicomedia (137/136 BC), who died 131/130 BC and was succeeded by Crates of Tarsus. Crates died in 127/126 BC and was succeeded by Clitomachus. Carneades died in 129/128 BC, at the advanced age of 85 (although Cicero says 90).

Carneades is described as a man of unwearied industry. He was so engrossed in his studies, that he let his hair and nails grow to an immoderate length, and was so absent at his own table (for he would never dine out), that his servant and concubine, Melissa, was constantly obliged to feed him. Latin writer and author Valerius Maximus, to whom we owe the last anecdote, tells us that Carneades, before discussing with Chrysippus, was wont to purge himself with hellebore, to have a sharper mind.

== Philosophy ==
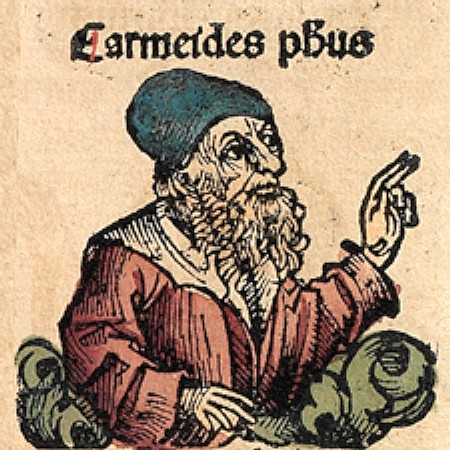
Carneades, depicted as a medieval scholar in the Nuremberg Chronicle, where he is called "Carmeides".

Carneades is known as an Academic Skeptic. Academic Skeptics (so called because this was the type of skepticism taught in Plato's Academy in Athens) hold that all knowledge is impossible, except for the knowledge that all other knowledge is impossible.

Carneades was so faithful to his own principles of withholding assent that Clitomachus confesses he never knew what his master really thought on any subject. In ethics, which more particularly were the subject of his long and laborious study, he seems to have denied the conformity of the moral ideas with nature. This he particularly insisted on in the second oration on Justice, in which he manifestly wished to convey his own notions on the subject; and he there maintains that ideas of justice are not derived from nature, but that they are purely artificial for purposes of expediency.

=== Critique of criteria of truth ===
All this, however, was nothing but the special application of his general theory, that people did not possess, and never could possess, any criterion of truth.

Carneades argued that, if there were a criterion, it must exist either in reason (logos), or sensation (aisthêsis), or conception (phantasia). But then reason itself depends on conception, and this again on sensation; and we have no means of judging whether our sensations are true or false, whether they correspond to the objects that produce them, or carry wrong impressions to the mind, producing false conceptions and ideas, and leading reason also into error. Therefore, sensation, conception, and reason, are alike disqualified for being the criterion of truth.

=== Persuasiveness or probability and action ===
But after all, people must live and act, and must have some rule of practical life; therefore, although it is impossible to pronounce anything as absolutely true, we may yet establish probabilities of various degrees. For, although we cannot say that any given conception or sensation is in itself true, yet some sensations appear to us more true than others, and we must be guided by that which seems the most true. Again, sensations are not single, but generally combined with others, which either confirm or contradict them; and the greater this combination the greater is the probability of that being true which the rest combine to confirm; and the case in which the greatest number of conceptions, each in themselves apparently most true, should combine to affirm that which also in itself appears most true, would present to Carneades the highest probability, and his nearest approach to truth.

Carneades' most sustained attack on the possibility of certainty was directed at the Stoic doctrine of the "cognitive impression" (καταληπτικὴ φαντασία, katalēptikē phantasia), which the Stoics held to be the criterion of truth: an impression so clear and distinct that it could only have arisen from its real object and therefore guaranteed certain knowledge. Drawing on the indistinguishability of dreams, hallucinations, optical illusions and the impressions of the insane from veridical waking perception, together with everyday examples such as identical twins and indistinguishable eggs, Carneades argued that for any true impression a perceptually indistinguishable false impression could in principle exist, so that no impression carries an internal mark by which it can be reliably set apart from a counterfeit. Extending the argument from sensation to reason itself, he deployed dialectical devices such as the sorites paradox and the liar paradox to show that logos likewise possesses no infallible criterion for separating truth from falsehood.

In place of certainty, Carneades introduced a graded notion of the "persuasive" or "convincing" impression (πιθανόν, pithanon) as a sufficient guide to action. According to the report of Sextus Empiricus, he distinguished three ascending grades: (1) the simply persuasive impression (πιθανὴ φαντασία, pithanē phantasia); (2) the persuasive and "undistracted" impression (πιθανὴ καὶ ἀπερίσπαστος, pithanē kai aperispastos) — one that is not contradicted by other plausible impressions which would draw the perceiver's attention away from it; and (3) the persuasive, undistracted, and "thoroughly examined" impression (πιθανὴ καὶ ἀπερίσπαστος καὶ διεξωδευμένη, pithanē kai aperispastos kai diexōdeumenē), which has been systematically tested with respect to the perceiver's own faculties, the perceptibility of the object (its size, distance, and motion), the circumstances of perception (such as the clarity of the medium), and its consistency with related impressions stored in memory. This third grade represents the highest degree of warranted confidence a Carneadean can attain, but strictly it remains short of certainty: it furnishes a sufficient practical basis for action without any claim to have grasped the truth itself, and was applied chiefly to ordinary perceptual judgments rather than to abstract philosophical doctrines, for which the relevant testing criteria are unavailable. Carneades was nevertheless careful not to convert his critique into the dogmatic claim that nothing can be known, since asserting such a thesis as certainly true would itself violate the skeptical stance. The wise person was rather to withhold full assent (epochē) and be guided in practical life by the persuasive. Whether this withholding was absolute, as in the interpretation of his pupil Clitomachus, or whether Carneades allowed the wise person a weaker, qualified form of assent to persuasive impressions, as in the interpretation of Philo of Larissa and Metrodorus of Stratonicea, was already disputed within the Academy in antiquity and remains contested in modern scholarship.

== See also ==
- Academica (Cicero)
- Anti-realism
- Moral relativism
- Philosophical skepticism
- Pyrrhonism
- Subjectivism

== Sources ==
- Dorandi, Tiziano (1999). "Chapter 2: Chronology". In Algra, Keimpe; et al. (eds.). The Cambridge History of Hellenistic Philosophy. Cambridge: Cambridge University Press. pp. 33, 48. ISBN 9780521250283.
