= Acatalepsy =

Concept of human knowledge in philosophy

Acatalepsy (from the Greek α̉- 'privative' and καταλαμβάνειν 'to seize'), in philosophy, is incomprehensibleness, or the impossibility of comprehending or conceiving some or all things. The doctrine held by the ancient Skeptic philosophers, that human knowledge never amounts to certainty, but only to probability.

The Pyrrhonians attempted to show, while Academic skeptics of the Platonic Academy asserted an absolute acatalepsia; all human science or knowledge, according to them, went no further than to appearances and verisimilitude. It is the antithesis of the Stoic doctrine of katalepsis or Apprehension. According to the Stoics, katalepsis was true perception, but to the Skeptics, all perceptions were acataleptic, i.e. bear no conformity to the objects perceived, or, if they did bear any conformity, it could never be known.

== See also ==
- Definist fallacy
- Socratic fallacy
- Thing-in-itself
