= List of pre-Socratic philosophers =

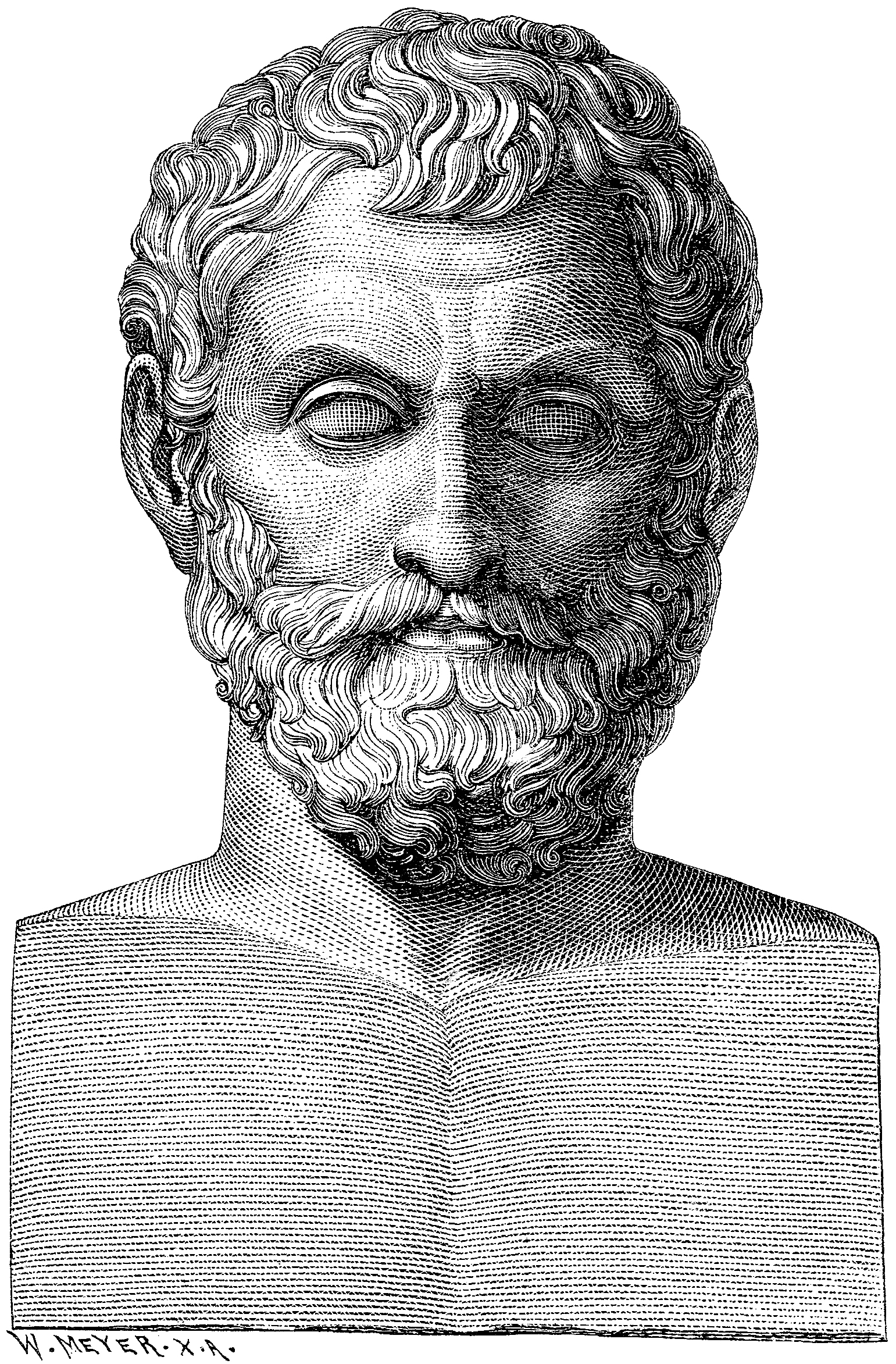
Thales of Miletus is credited as the first Greek philosopher.

Pre-Socratic philosophy developed in ancient Greece during the 6th and 5th centuries BC. The pre-Socratic philosophers include those who preceded Socrates and Plato, though in some cases it is used to describe their contemporaries or later figures who continued pre-Socratic thought. The pre-Socratic philosophers were followed by the classical philosophers, including Socrates, Plato, and Aristotle.

Diels–Kranz numbering, developed by Hermann Alexander Diels and Walther Kranz in the early 20th century, is the standard for classifying the pre-Socratic philosophers. Most information about the pre-Socratic philosophers is lost, with current knowledge being obtained from the records kept by later doxographers and philosophers. These include Plato, Aristotle, Plutarch, Sextus Empiricus, Clement of Alexandria, Hippolytus of Rome, Diogenes Laertius, Stobaeus, and Simplicius of Cilicia, among others.

The pre-Socratic philosophers are organised by their belief systems, called schools, in which one followed or expanded on the teachings of his predecessors. New schools developed as philosophers criticised or responded to one another. Each pre-Socratic philosopher and school engaged in natural inquiry, but their subjects, methods, and motivations varied significantly.

The pre-Socratics were the first Western philosophers and began with the Ionian school that believed in material monism. The original Ionians were the Milesians: Thales, Anaximander, and Anaximenes. They were succeeded by the Ionian Heraclitus, Pythagoras of the Pythagorean school, the theology of Xenophanes, and Parmenides of the Eleatic school. The Elatics were challenged by the pluralist philosophy of Empedocles and Anaxagoras and the atomist philosophy of Leucippus and Democritus. The Sophists then taught rhetoric and moral philosophy. Pre-Socratic philosophy was preceded by the works of poets and theologians like Homer and Hesiod.

== Ionians ==
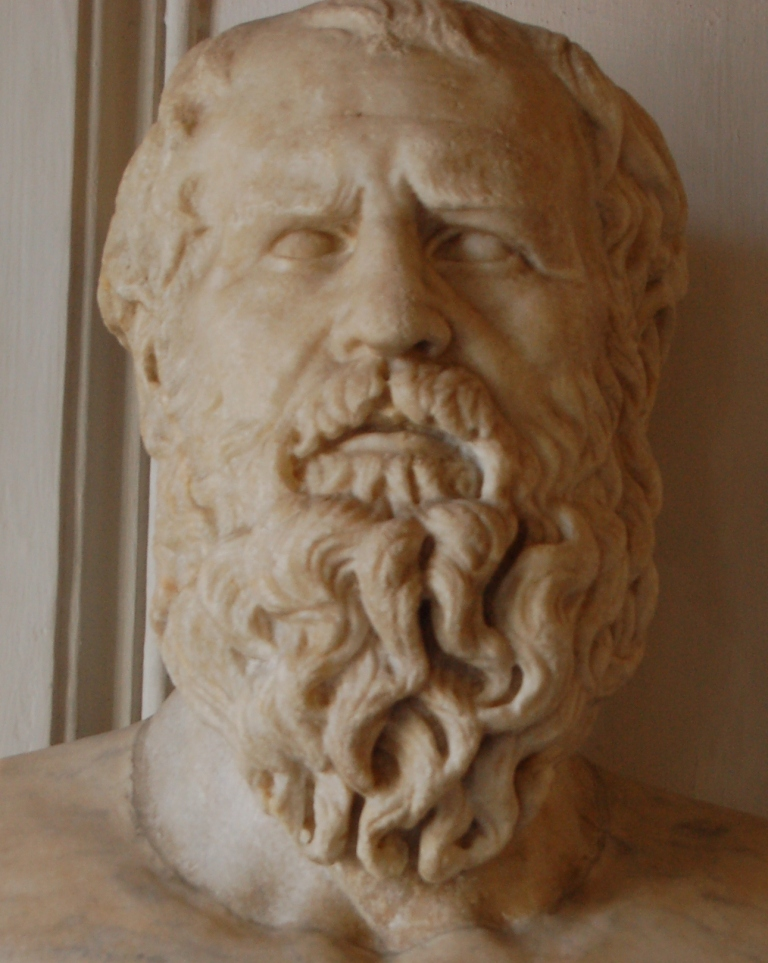
Heraclitus contributed to Ionian philosophy by diverging from the Milesians.

Western philosophy originated with the Ionian school. They were material monists who believed that there was a single underlying material origin of all that exists, an arche, made up of a specific element. The first of the Ionian philosophers were from the city-state Miletus. The Milesian school was the first group to use inquiry instead of mythology to study nature, developing their philosophy in the 6th century BC.

- Thales of Miletus is considered the first Greek philosopher. He proposed that water is the arche that underlies all things.
- Anaximander was a student of Thales and the first Greek to write a philosophical treatise. He described the apeiron, an eternal and infinite entity, as the arche. Diogenes Laertius credited him as the founder of Ionian philosophy.
- Anaximenes of Miletus was a student of Anaximander. He proposed that air is the arche and that the Earth lies on top of air. He said that all things are formed by rarefaction or condensation of the air.

Ionian philosophy continued with Heraclitus, who challenged some of the ideas of the Milesians.

- Heraclitus described a system in which all things are in constant flux and that the unity of opposites forms reality through opposing forces. He proposed that fire is the arche. He was active in the 6th century BC.
- Antisthenes of Ephesus was, according to Diogenes Laeritus, an adherent to the philosophy of Heraclitus.
- Cratylus was an adherent to the philosophy of Heraclitus. He believed that because all things are in a state of change, nothing can be accurately described. He is said to have believed this to the point that he eventually only communicated using his finger. He was an instructor of Plato.
- Diogenes of Apollonia revived the ideas of the Milesian school in the 5th century BC. He argued that air is the arche. He believed that only a single arche must exist and this was the only way that things could interact with each other. He was one of the final Ionian philosophers.
- Idaeus of Himera followed the belief of Anaximenes that air is the arche.
- Mandrolytus of Priene was a student of Thales.

== Xenophanes ==
- Xenophanes was a philosopher active in the 6th century BC. He challenged the Homeric belief in a pantheon of human-like gods, instead asserting a single god that lacked thought or motion. Xenophanes is sometimes erroneously described as the first Eleatic, a Pythagorean, or an Ionian, but he is not classified under any specific school of philosophy.

== Eleatics ==
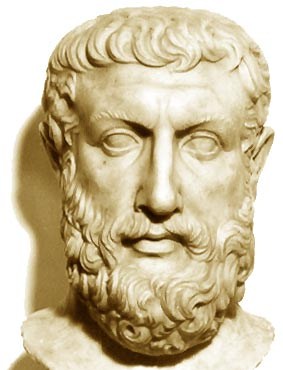
The Eleatic school was founded by Parmenides.

The Eleatics rejected the concepts of change and pluralism. They were active in the 5th century BC.

- Parmenides founded the Eleatic school. He said that the world could be understood as a mortal who sees a false world based on opinions or divinely as it truly exists where all things are a single entity or being.
- Zeno of Elea was a student of Parmenides who devised numerous paradoxes. His arguments were a response to the challenges against the Eleatic school levelled by the pluralists.
- Melissus of Samos was a follower of Parmenides. He expanded upon the arguments of Parmenides, presenting them as prose instead of verse. He believed that existence persists infinitely through space and time instead of having finite space and existing without time.
- Callias of Aexone was a student of Zeno.

== Pluralists ==
The pluralists rejected the monist belief of the Ionians that all things are made up of a single element. Instead, they believed that there are multiple discrete elements that make up the world. Pluralism was a response to the Eleatic school. They were active in the 5th century BC.

- Empedocles was a pluralist philosopher. He was the first to propose the four classical elements of water, earth, fire, and air. He believed that these were the most basic elements and that all things in the world were created by mixing them in different proportions. They are drawn together and split apart by forces he called love and strife, respectively.
- Anaxagoras was a pluralist philosopher. He believed that all things exist independently and that they combined to create the world. He introduced his concept of the mind, nous, as an underlying principle of existence.
- Archelaus was a student of Anaxagoras. Instead of describing nous as its own element, Archelaus considered it to be an aspect of air. He is said to have been the teacher of Socrates.
- Ariphrades is given as the name of a dishonourable student of Anaxagoras.
- Carneades of Athens was, according to Suda, a student of Anaxagoras.
- Metrodorus of Lampsacus was a student of Anaxagoras who analysed the works of Homer through pluralist belief, assigning each character a different element.

== Atomists ==
The atomists believed that all of existence consists of either indivisible atoms or the Void that exists around and between them. Atomism was a response to the Eleatic school.

- Leucippus introduced the concept of the atom. Little is known about him, and he is traditionally described in the context of his student Democritus.
- Democritus was a student of Leucippus who developed an atomist theory.

Students of the pre-Socratic atomists brought the philosophy into the Hellenistic era, including Hecataeus of Abdera, Apollodorus of Cyzicus, Nausiphanes, Diotimus of Tyre, Bion of Abdera, Bolus of Mendes, Diogenes of Smyrna, Anaxarchus, Nessos of Chios, and Metrodorus of Chios. They were succeeded by Epicurus and his atomist school of Epicureanism.

== Pythagoreans ==
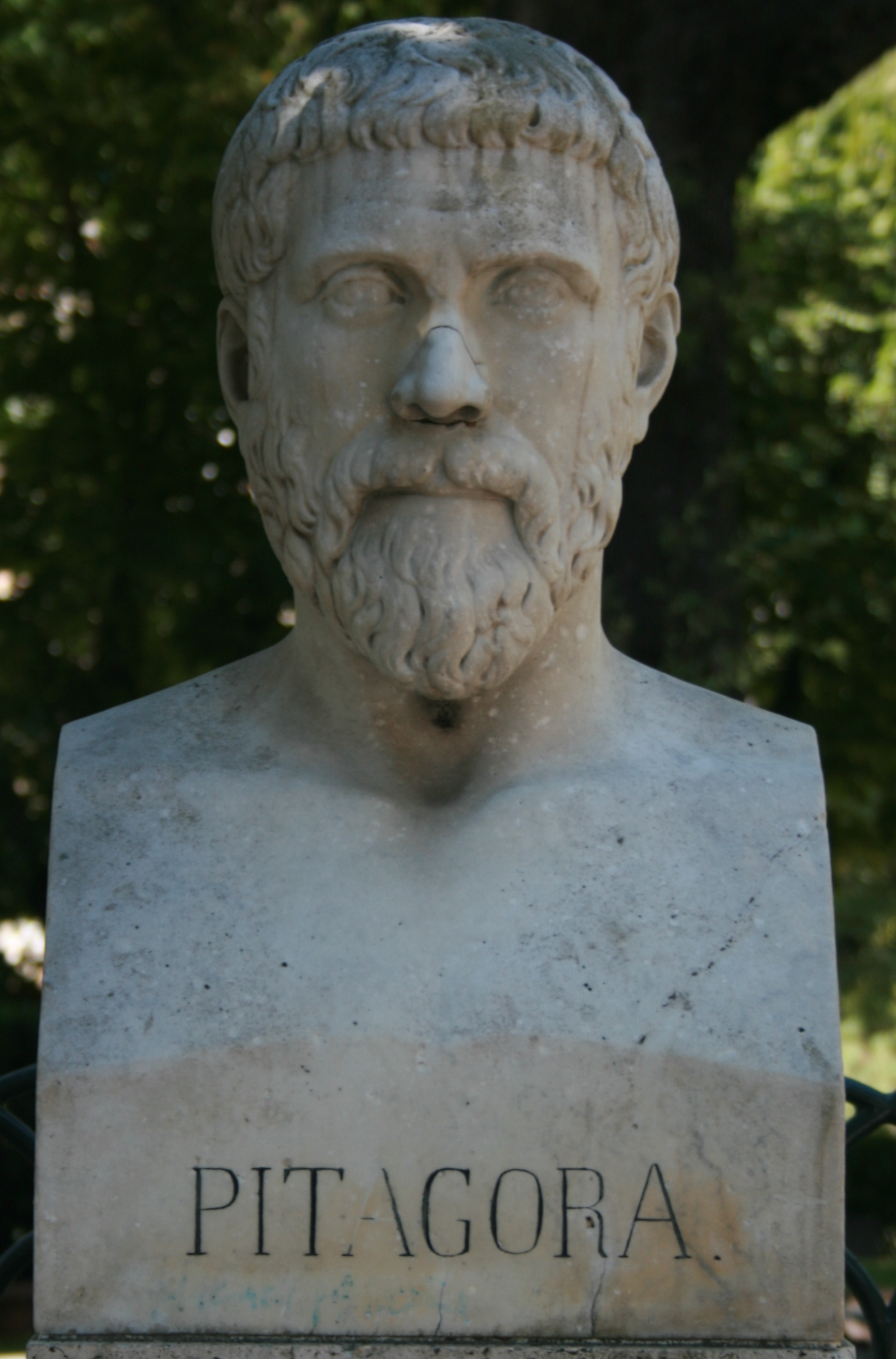
Pythagoras was the leader of the Pythagoreans.

The first Italian philosophers were immigrants from Ionia. The most prominent of these was Pythagoras, who founded his philosophy of Pythagoreanism in the 6th century BC. This is the only ancient Greek philosophical movement in which a single person is considered its formal leader. Pythagoreanism was based on the idea that numbers are the basis of all things. There was no single defining trait shared by all of the Pythagoreans, and they engaged in a variety of pursuits that included athletics, mathematics, medicine, natural philosophy, and politics. Iamblichus identified 235 Pythagoreans by name, but the associated identity for many of these names is unknown.

- Pythagoras was a mathematician. He founded a group that separated itself from contemporary religion and promised its members a better life. Many of his followers attributed their own beliefs to Pythagoras. He believed in metempsychosis, in which souls can transmigrate.

Pythagoras is said to have sorted his followers into two groups: the students that were taught his philosophy in full, and the auditors who were only allowed limited knowledge. Pythagoreanism was religious as well as philosophical, and there is sometimes disagreement over how involved one had to be with Pythagorean ideas to be considered a Pythagorean.

- Abaris the Hyperborean was a legendary prophet from around the 6th century BC who, according to Iamblichus, became a Pythagorean.
- Alcimachus of Paros was a student of Pythagoras who left Croton following attacks against the Pythagoreans.
- Arignote was a Pythagorean writer. She may have been the daughter of Pythagoras and Theano.
- Aristaeus of Croton was a student of Pythagoras who is said to have later married his widowed wife Theano. He is believed to have written about harmony.
- Brontinus (alternatively Brotinus) was an early Pythagorean. He is said to be either the father or the husband of Theano. He may have been a student of Alcmaeon of Croton.
- Deinarchus of Paros was a follower of Pythagoras who left Croton amid attacks against the Pythagoreans. According to Iamblichus, he had followers of his own.
- Democedes was a physician and the son of Calliphon. Iamblichus listed him among the Pythagoreans who left Croton following attacks against the Pythagoreans.
- Calliphon of Croton is generally accepted to have been a Pythagorean, but little else is known about him. He is said to have been a priest and to have advised Pythagoras from the afterlife.
- Cercops was considered a Pythagorean by the Suda and Hermann Alexander Diels. Several poems, sometimes described as poems of Orpheus, are attributed to him.
- Cheilonis was a prominent female Pythagorean and is believed to have been the daughter of Chilon of Sparta.
- Damo was, according to Iamblichus, the daughter of Pythagoras and the mother of Bitale.
- Dios is the attributed writer of Pythagorean works on aesthetics.
- Euryphamus of Syracuse was a Pythagorean in a story related by Iamblichus to demonstrate Pythagorean honour, in which Euryphamus forgets he was going to meet Lysis, but Lysis committed to their meeting and waited for him overnight. Fragments about life are attributed to Euryphamus.
- Hippasus is described as the founder of either the mathematikoi or the akousmatikoi. According to Iamblichus, Hippasus was rejected by the Pythagoreans and killed at sea because he created a regular dodecahedron. Aristotle said that Hippasus believed in fire as an arche.
- Mnesarchus was the son of Pythagoras. He succeeded Aristaeus as leader of the Pythagoreans.
- Myia is believed to be the daughter of Pythagoras and Theano, and the wife of Milo of Croton.
- Orestadas was a sixth-century BC Pythagorean described by Diogenes Laeritius as the man who freed Xenophanes from slavery. He may have been the same Orestadas whom Iamblichus said was from Metapontum.
- Parmeniscus (alternatively Parmiscus) is generally accepted to have been a Pythagorean, but little else is known about him. According to Favorinus, Parmeniscus may have saved Xenophanes from slavery.
- Petron of Himera was an early Pythagorean who described the world through geometry. He may have believed that there are 183 worlds, sorted by element. This was attributed to him by a third-hand report from Plutarch. Leonid Zhmud disputes Petron's classification as a Pythagorean.
- Telauges was the son of Pythagoras who practiced a form of Pythagoreanism reminiscent of Cynicism.
- Theano is said to be either the daughter or wife of Brontinus and either the student or wife of Pythagoras.
- Thymaridas believed in divine providence, according to Androcydes. He may have been a student of Pythagoras.
- Timaratus or Timares of Locri was a legislator who studied under Pythagoras. Iamblichus gave both names to describe a legislator from Locri and they were likely the same person.
- Zalmoxis was a slave of Pythagoras who studied Pythagoreanism before he was freed. He is said to have taught the Getae and the Celts.

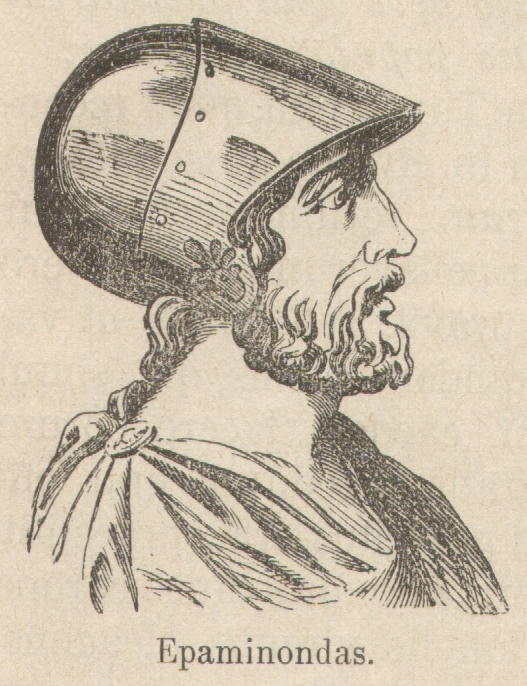
The Spartan general Epaminondas was a Pythagorean.

Later writers classified the Pythagorean into two schools, the mathematikoi and the akousmatikoi, in the 5th century BC. These were allegedly grown from the students and the auditors, respectively. The akousmatikoi was more interested in ritual, while the mathematici paid closer attention to scientific inquiry.

- Ameinias was described as a Pythagorean teacher of Parmenides in a second-hand report by Diogenes Laertius. He is described as "poor but worthy".
- Archippus was said by Iamblichus to be one of two to escape an attack on the Pythagoreans, alongside Lysis. Nothing else about him is known.
- Athamas of Posidonia was a Pythagorean who, according to Clement of Alexandria, believed that all things are made of the four classical elements.
- Bulagoras was, according to Iamblichus, the fourth person to lead the Pythagoreans.
- Ecphantus the Pythagorean believed that the Earth rotates on its axis instead of moving through space. He held the atomist belief that there are basic indivisible elements defined by their size, shape, and force.
- Epaminondas was a general who studied Pythagoreanism under Lysis of Tarentum.
- Epicharmus of Kos was a comedian who criticised Xenophanes and used relativism as a satirical tool. He studied Pythagoreanism but did not engage in philosophy himself.
- Gartydas of Croton was, according to Iamblichus, the successor of Bulagoras as leader of the Pythagoreans. He is said to have died of a broken heart when seeing the aftermath of a fight between Pythagoreans and their opponents.
- Hicetas was a Pythagorean who believed that all of the celestial bodies are still except the Earth revolving on its axis. His lifespan is unknown.
- Hippo (alternatively Hippon) was a Pythagorean who followed the teachings of the Milesian Thales. He was an adherent to Thales' belief that water is the arche and was described as atheist for his belief in a purely natural arche. He did not provide any significant additions to Milesian thought. He was a biologist and studied reproduction.
- Hippomedon of Asine argued that explanations for Pythagorean ideas had changed over time as Pythagoras's original explanations were lost.
- Ion of Chios was a follower of Pythagoras who wrote the Triagmos and held beliefs about the number three. He believed that earth, fire, and air are the three elements while intelligence, luck, and strength are the three virtues. He was known for his tragic poetry.
- Lysis of Taras believed that God is an irrational number. He was said by Iamblichus to be one of two to escape from an attack on the Pythagoreans, alongside Archippus. He was the instructor of the Theban general Epaminondas.
- Megillus wrote a book about numbers.
- Menestor was a botanist who applied the theory of opposites to each aspect of a plant.
- Metopus as a Pythagorean to whom fragments about virtue are attributed.
- Myllias of Croton was the husband of Timycha. He is said to have been chased by attackers along with other Pythagoreans, but accepted death when they reached a bean field because Pythagoreanism forbade touching beans.
- Ocellus Lucanus was a Pythagorean, but his beliefs and lifespan are uncertain. He may have believed that humanity has existed eternally or he may have held an Aristotelian view of creation.
- Onatas (alternatively Onatus) was a Pythagorean to whom several fragments are sometimes attributed.
- Opsimus believed that God is represented by the number one.
- Paron was a Pythagorean known for responding that time is ignorance upon hearing that time is wisdom.
- Phintys was a Pythagorean. A book on living a moderate life as a woman is attributed to her.
- Pythocleides was a Pythagorean who studied "solemn music". He is said to be the instructor of Agathocles.
- Syllus of Croton was said to have given up money to avoid taking an oath, demonstrating the Pythagorean opposition to oathtaking.
- Theaetetus was a student of Theodorus. The construction of the octahedron and the icosahedron are credited to him.
- Theages supported democracy in Croton. Stobaeus incorrectly attributed a book on virtue to him.
- Theanor of Croton is described by Plutarch, though his historicity is uncertain.
- Theocles developed a legal code for Rhegium. He may have been named Theaetetus as Iamblichus gives both names.
- Theodorus of Cyrene was a Pythagorean who studied astronomy and music using mathematics. He instructed Plato and was associated with Protagoras.
- Theophris of Croton was the father of Philtys.
- Timaeus of Locri was a Pythagorean. There is no record of him except for his depiction in Plato's Timaeus, and he may have been created as a character for the dialogue.
- Timycha was a Pythagorean who was the wife of Myllias. She is said to have bit off her tongue to avoid telling the secrets of Pythagoreanism.
- Xuthus believed that things move in a wave pattern, which would allow motion without the existence of the Void.
- Zopyrus of Tarentum was an engineer who specialised in making weapons. He may have been the same person as Zopyrus of Heraclea, who is attributed as the author of several poems that inspired Plato.

Three later Pythagoreans were described by Aristoxenus.

- Amyclas was a Pythagorean who is said to have worked with Cleinias to stop Plato from burning the works of Democritus. Nothing else about him is known.
- Cleinias of Tarentum (alternatively Clinias) was a Pythagorean who is said to have travelled to help Prorus with his financial need because of their mutual Pythagorean beliefs. He is also said to have worked with Amyclas to stop Plato from burning the works of Democritus. He believed that the lyre can cure anger and he held disdain toward women.
- Prorus of Cyrene was a Pythagorean associated with Cleinias.

Three Pythagoreans are grouped for claiming discovery of the types of proportion.

- Euphranor is said, along with Myonides, to have taken six types of proportion and expanded the list to ten types.
- Myonides is said, along with Euphranor, to have taken six types of proportion and expanded the list to ten types.
- Simus of Poseidonia claimed to have discovered seven types of proportion attributed to previous Pythagorean thought.

Some Pythagoreans were known primarily for their athletic abilities and their performances in the Ancient Olympic Games.

- Astylos of Croton was a Pythagorean athlete.
- Dicon was a Pythagorean athlete.
- Iccus of Taranto was a Pythagorean physician and athlete known for his abstinent lifestyle.
- Milo of Croton (alternatively Milon) was an athlete and military commander. He hosted meetings of the Pythagoreans in his home.

The final generation of Pythagoreans was active in Phlius where they studied under Philolaus and Eurytus. They were contemporaries of Socrates.

- Philolaus believed that things are defined by geometric shapes and the numerical qualities of these shapes. He developed a cosmogony made up of opposites but believed that the truths of reality are unknowable. Unlike the previous Pythagoreans, Philolaus wrote a book on his philosophy.
- Eurytus was a student of Philolaus. He believed that all things are defined by a specific number, instead of just shapes, the soul, and the Void. He is known for arranging pebbles into shapes to demonstrate the numerical components of different things.
- Arion was a student of Philolaus.
- Diocles of Phlius was a student of Philolaus and Eurytus. According to Iamblichus, he fled Italy during the attacks against Pythagoreans.
- Echecrates of Phlius was a student of Philolaus. He appeared in Plato's Phaedo where he invoked the belief that the soul is a harmony in line with Pythagorean thought.
- Phanto of Phlius (alternatively Phanton) was a student of Philolaus. He moved to Italy but fled when the Pythagorean presence in Rhegium ended.
- Polymnastos of Phlius (alternatively Polymnastus) was a student of Philolaus.
- Xenophilus was a student of Philolaus and an instructor of Aristoxenus. He studied music.

Pythagoreanism remained a major philosophical school until the 4th century BC as violent attacks against its followers ended the movement. Some philosophers continued pre-Socratic Pythagoreanism as contemporaries of Plato or Aristotle.

- Archytas was a harmonic theorist who developed a mathematical description of music. He also challenged the cosmology of Parmenides by asking whether he could reach beyond fixed stars once he reached them. He was the most prominent Pythagorean of the generation following Philolaus. By some accounts, he was a teacher of Plato.
- Aristoxenus was a student of Xenophilus. He later became a student of Aristotle.
- Dicaearchus was a student of Aristotle.
- Lyco of Iasos (alternatively Lycon or Lycus) wrote a book about the diet of Pythagoreans and is accused by Aristocles of Messene of making false claims about Aristotle.

The Peripatetic school later recorded the ideas of the Pythagoreans. Pythagorean ideas were combined with Plato's by the Neopythagoreans in the 1st century BC, who were then succeeded by the Neoplatonists in the 3rd century AD.

== Sophists ==
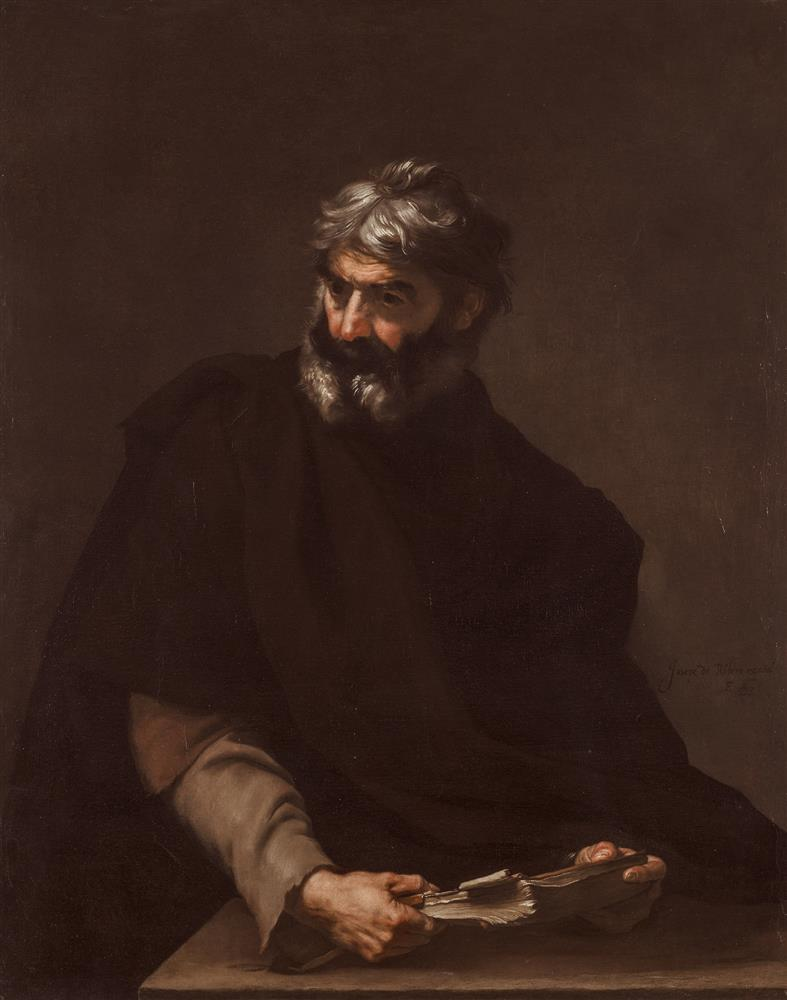
Protagoras was the first of the Sophists.

The Sophists were rhetoricians and political theorists who sold their services as teachers. They did not adhere to a unified school of philosophy. They instead focused on human development and improvement, and they were the first to engage in moral philosophy. The Sophists were an exception among the early Greek thinkers in that they did not include cosmogony in their studies. It is debated as to whether they were true philosophers, but they are generally described alongside the pre-Socratics in modern study. They were active in the 5th century BC.

The first two Sophists followed the system of rhetoric attributed to Corax and Tisias.

- Protagoras was the first Sophist. He believed in relativism, in which truth is defined by one's perception of truth. He held that for every argument, a coherent counterargument can be formed against it. Protagoras studied the philosophy of Democritus and was a teacher of legal rhetoric. He was an associate of the statesman Pericles.
- Gorgias believed that nothing exists, and that if things did exist then it would be impossible to understand or communicate. He said that rhetoric is not inherently good or evil, with its morality depending on how it is used, and he considered art a form of admirable deception. Gorgias popularised many writing concepts, including antitheses, triplets, and rhetorical questions. He was a student of the Eleatic Zeno and incorporated elements of Eleatic thought into his metaphysical philosophy. He was also an associate of Empedocles.

Protagoras and Gorgias were followed by five more Sophists, and the seven are grouped Hermann Alexander Diels as the Older Sophists who were active in the late 5th and early 4th centuries BC.

- Antiphon the Sophist believed that man-made law is distinct from natural law and argued that natural law takes precedence. Nothing is known about his life and he may be the same person as other Greek writers named Antiphon.
- Critias was an Athenian tyrant who once studied under Socrates.
- Hippias was a polymath who is credited as the first doxographer. The discovery of the quadratrix is attributed to him. He appeared in multiple Platonic dialogues.
- Prodicus studied the origin of religion and the motivations to worship certain gods. He also sought to form exact definitions for words and considered the nature of nominalism and realism. He is said to have been an instructor of Agathon, Euripides, Isocrates, Pausanias, Theramenes, and Thrasymachus. According to Plato, Prodicus was also a teacher of Socrates.
- Thrasymachus believed either that justice serves the stronger party or that it serves the good of others. He is primarily known for being adapted into the Republic by Plato. He was an instructor of Clitophon.

Other Sophists were active during the time of Socrates.

- Alcidamas was a student of Gorgias who is said to have taken charge of Gorgias' school.
- Andron of Gargettus is described in the Gorgias as studying alongside Callicles, Tisander of Aphidnae, and Nausicydes of Cholarges. Together they determined that study of philosophy should not be done in excess. He is sometimes described as a student of Hippias.
- Antimoerus of Mende was one of the students of Protagoras who studied to become a Sophist instead of to practice politics.
- Antiphon of Rhamnus was a Sophist speechwriter. He believed knowledge is derived from experience and that words are only used as labels.
- Archagoras was, according to Diogenes Laertius, a follower of Protagoras.
- Callias of Alopece was a student of Protagoras, Hippias, and Prodicus. He appeared in several of Plato's dialogues.
- Callicles believed that the morality of nature encourages self-interest while the morality of justice restrains those who would take advantage of others. Unlike other Sophists who held this belief, he also believed that some people are naturally superior and should follow the morality of nature.
- Diagoras of Melos was an atheist who presented the problem of evil. He was a student of Prodicus or of Democritus.
- Dionysodorus was the brother of Euthydemus.
- Euthydemus of Chios studied logic and martial arts. He appeared in the Platonic dialogue Euthydemus. He was the brother of Dionysodorus.
- Evathlus was named as a student of Protagoras by Diogenes Laertius.
- Hecataeus of Miletus was a historian and geographer who, according to Suda, was a student of Protagoras.
- Isocrates rejected the Sophists after studying under Gorgias, Prodicus, and Theramenes.
- Lycophron was a follower of Gorgias. He described how matter and form relate and whether a thing with multiple traits can be described as a unity of these traits.
- Nausicydes of Cholarges is described in the Gorgias as studying alongside Callicles, Tisander of Aphidnae, and Andron of Gargettus. Together they determined that study of philosophy should not be done in excess.
- Polus was a student of Gorgias. He was adapted into the Platonic dialogue Gorgias.
- Theodorus of Byzantium was a rhetorician whom Plato praised in Phaedrus.
- Theramenes was a politician in Athens who studied under Prodicus. He may have been the instructor of Isocrates and an associate of Socrates.
- Tisander of Aphidnae is described in the Gorgias as studying alongside Callicles, Nausicydes of Cholarges and Andron of Gargettus. Together they determined that study of philosophy should not be done in excess.

There are two Sophists whose writings have survived but whose names are unknown.

- The Anonymus Iamblichi is an anonymous Sophist known only through writings quoted by Iamblichus. This person rejected man-made law as a means for the strong to pursue self-interest, instead suggesting that it is a means for the weak to protect themselves from the strong.
- The author of the Sophistic Dissoi logoi is unknown. The Dissoi logoi encourages people to argue for both sides of a given issue.

A Second Sophistic movement existed in the 2nd and 3rd centuries AD, but it did not retain the philosophical elements of the original Sophist movement.

== Other philosophers ==
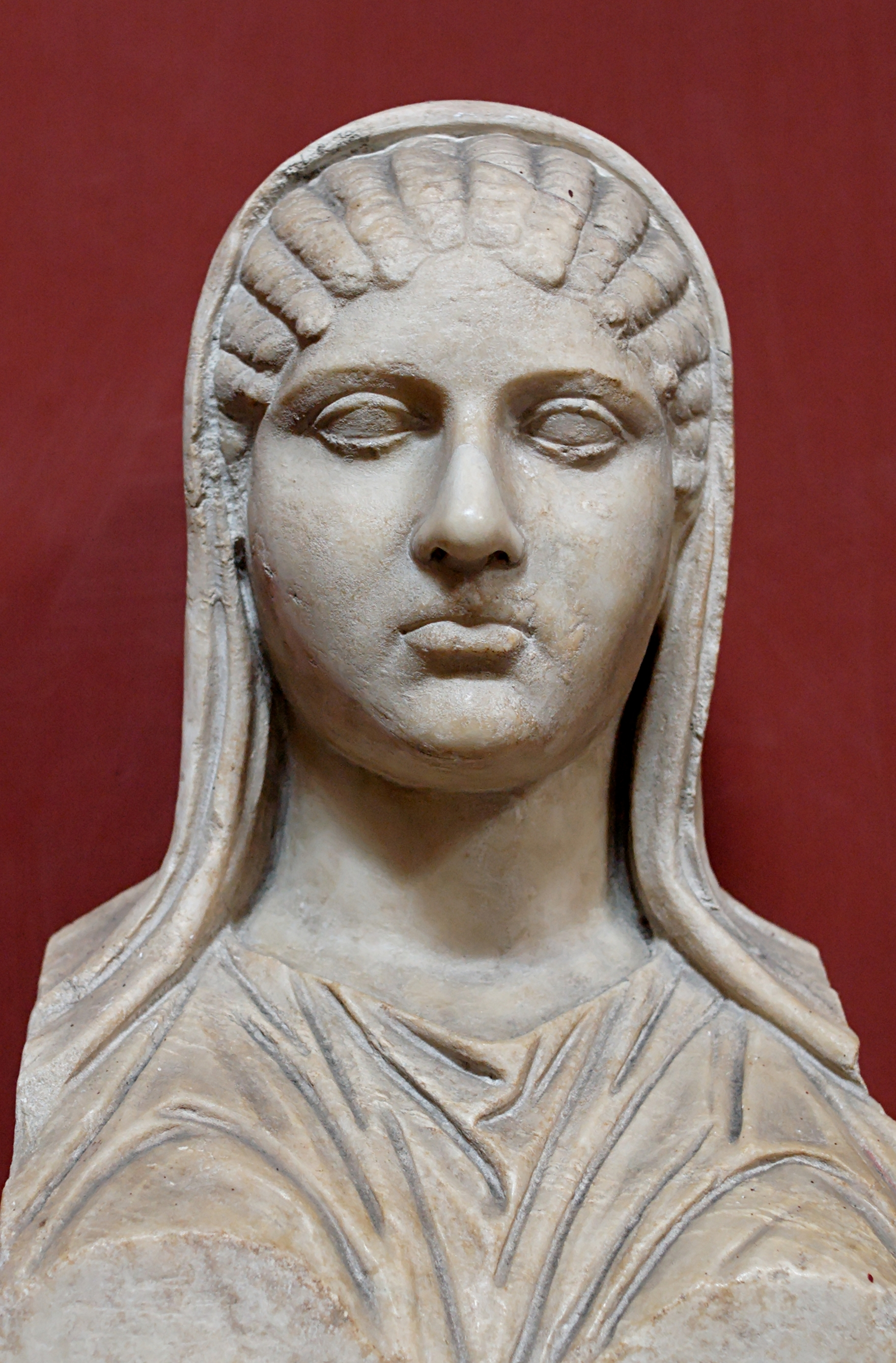
Aspasia was an instructor of Socrates.

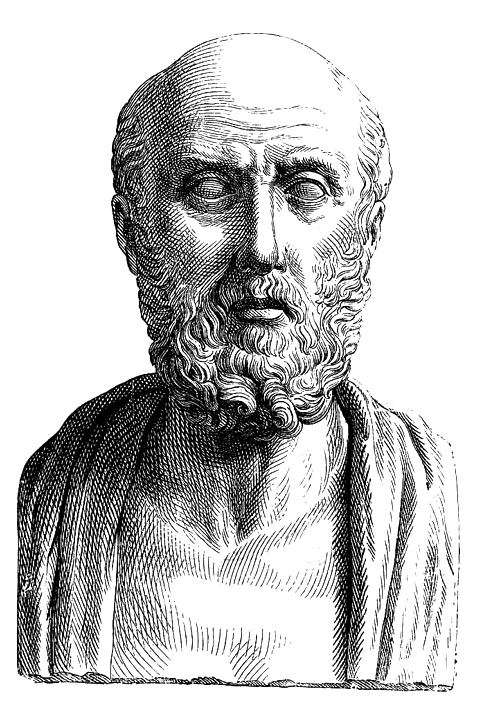
Hippocrates of Cos developed scientific study of medicine.

- Thrasyalces of Thasos was a meteorologist who said that the Nile rises because of summer rain and that the wind is primarily made from the north wind and the south wind. He is described as one of "the early philosophers".
- Cleostratus (6th century BC) was an astronomer who wrote Astrologia. He used the teachings of Anaximander to study the paths of the stars.
- Theagenes of Rhegium (6th century BC) was the first known writer to give a philosophical treatment to the works of Homer. He described the Greek gods as an allegory for the elements and other concepts. He was one of the earliest critics to use the allegorical method or to analyse a work's grammatical meaning.
- Aeschylus (5th century BC) was a student of Hippocrates of Chios who wrote about comets.
- Alcmaeon of Croton (5th century BC) was a medical writer who described health as a balance between the parts of the body. He identified the brain as the organ that perceives, and wrote arguments to support the existence of metempsychosis. He is associated with the Pythagoreans but is generally not considered to be among their members.
- Alexamenus of Teos (5th century BC) was, according to Diogenes Laertius, the first person to write a Socratic dialogue.
- Aspasia (5th century BC) was a rhetorician who taught Socrates. She was the companion of Pericles.
- Cephalus of Syracuse (5th century BC) was an associate of Socrates.
- Charmides (5th century BC) was an uncle of Plato who appeared in the Platonic dialogue Charmides.
- Cleidemus (5th century BC) believed that the senses are caused by the textures of the organs allowing objects through. He argued that lightning is an illusion caused by phosphorescent sea water.
- Crates (5th century) was, according to Diogenes Laertius, the one who brought the writing of Heraclitus to mainland Greece.
- Crito of Alopece (5h century BC) was an associate of Socrates. According to Diogenes Laertius, he wrote seventeen philosophical dialogues.
- Damon of Athens (5th century BC) believed that music could develop positive traits in a person and that its study was necessary to be virtuous. He was an instructor of Pericles and possibly Socrates, and he has been described as a student of Agathocles, his student Lamprocles, or Prodicus.
- Diotima of Mantinea (5th century) was a woman who, according to Plato's Symposium, taught Socrates on philosophy of love.
- Euripides (5th century BC) was a dramatist who associated with philosophers. According to Diogenes Laeritius, he was a student of Anaxagoras and he travelled to Egypt with Plato.
- Hippocrates of Chios (5th century) was a mathematician who studied the geometry developed by Oenopides. He discovered the lune of Hippocrates and is credited as the first person to write a mathematics textbook, titled Elements.
- Hippodamus of Miletus (5th century BC) was a political theorist. He proposed that cities be constructed using a grid plan with wide roads, and he oversaw the construction of Piraeus.
- Ninon of Croton (5th century BC) was an opponent of the Pythagoreans. He published a book about the group's secrets that, according to Iamblichus, was entirely inaccurate.
- Oenopides (5th century BC) was an astronomer and mathematician who studied the Zodiac. He was accused of stealing the ideas of the Pythagoreans, and his philosophy was later adapted by the Stoics as evidence of God as the World-Soul.
- Philoxenus (5th century BC) was a student of either Anaxagoras or Protagoras.
- Polemarchus (5th century BC) was a philosopher depicted in Plato's Republic and whose death is recounted in Plato's Lysis.
- Polykleitos (5th century BC) was a sculptor. He wrote the Canon that considered the nature of aesthetics and the proportions of the human body.
- Clemens (5th and 4th centuries BC) was an associate of Libanius.
- Hippocrates of Cos (5th and 4th centuries BC) was a physician who applied scientific reasoning to medicine.
- Agathocles is said to be the student of Pythocleides, a Pythagorean, and the instructor of Lamprocles. According to Plato, Agathocles was the instructor of Damon of Athens.
- Boidas is only known for being criticised by the writer Diphilus.
- Lamprocles was a student of Agathocles. He is sometimes described as the instructor of Damon of Athens.
- Phaleas of Chalcedon proposed that land be distributed equally between the people. According to Aristotle, he was the first person to propose any form of equally-divided property. He is only known from his depiction in Aristotle's Politics.
- Xeniades was a metaphysical nihilist who believed that anything that exists emerges from and returns to nonbeing. His lifespan is unknown, and he is only known from the writings of Sextus Empiricus.

== Precursors ==
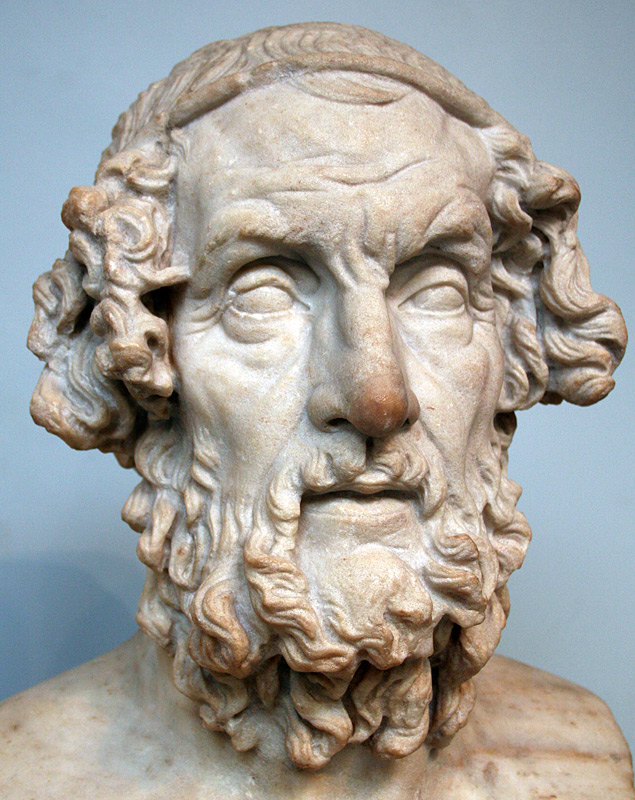
The epic poet Homer wrote about social themes that were later considered in philosophy.

Several poets and theologians who preceded the Milesian school provided early considerations of philosophical issues, often through mythological explanations. Although they were not philosophers, they are sometimes described in the context of pre-Socratic philosophy and its early development. Among them are figures of the 7th and 6th centuries BC who were sometimes grouped as the Seven Sages of Greece, but the list of names was not consistent.

- Orpheus was, according to legend, an early poet who developed Orphism. He is associated with the Orphic Theogony that describes the origin of the gods, and a belief in a soul distinct from the body. All that is known of him is based in Greek myth. His poetry is alternatively attributed to Onomacritus or to anonymous writers.
- Musaeus of Athens was said to be a student of Orpheus who brought Orphism to Athens.
- Homer (8th century BC) wrote about themes of heroism and virtue. Along with Hesiod, he was one of the earliest writers to consider social philosophy and how to live a virtuous life.
- Hermotimus of Clazomenae (8th and 7th centuries BC) is a legendary figure said to be able to leave his body. He described a concept resembling what Anaxagoras called nous, according to Aristotle.
- Hesiod (8th and 7th centuries BC) wrote of the Greek gods in his poems Theogony and Works and Days. He provided a broad mythological explanation for the origin of the world and the gods. Along with Homer, he was one of the earliest writers to consider social philosophy and how to live a virtuous life.
- Aristeas (7th century BC) was a figure considered important by the Pythagoreans.
- Linus (7th century BC) was, according to Diogenes Laeritius, a poet who wrote about the universe. Much of what is said about him comes from myth.
- Alcman (7th and 6th centuries BC) was a poet who attempted to describe a cosmogony of the gods.
- Cleobulus (7th and 6th centuries BC) was sometimes described as one of the Seven Sages of Greece. He is associated with several basic sayings and is believed to have studied Ancient Egyptian philosophy.
- Hermodamus of Samos (7th and 6th centuries BC) was an associated of Pythagoras. According to Iamblichus, they both studied together under Pherecydes of Syros.
- Myson of Chenae (7th and 6th centuries BC) was sometimes listed as one of the Seven Sages of Greece.
- Periander (7th and 6th centuries BC) was a ruler of Corinth who is sometimes listed as one of the Seven Sages of Greece.
- Pherecydes of Syros (7th or 6th century BC) described the world's creation by the gods. He was the first thinker to describe the transmigration of souls, metempsychosis, that was later attributed to Pythagoras. Aristotle considered his work to be halfway between mythology and philosophy. Pherecydes was a contemporary of Thales, with whom he had a correspondence, and he expressed ideas reminiscent of the Milesians.
- Pittacus of Mytilene (7th and 6th centuries BC) was a poet who is said to have freed Lesbos from tyranny. He is sometimes listed as one of the Seven Sages of Greece.
- Solon (7th and 6th centuries BC) was an early writer to consider ethics. He was a politician in Athens who is said to have studied philosophy in Egypt. He is sometimes listed as one of the Seven Sages of Greece.
- Aglaophamus (6th century BC) was a priest who, according to Iamblichus, taught Orphism to Pythagoras.
- Anacharsis (6th century BC) was a legendary Scythian who adopted Greek ideas. Suda credits him with the invention of the anchor and the potter's wheel. He later influenced the Cynics.
- Aristodemus of Sparta (6th century BC) was described as one of the Seven Sages of Greece by Dicaearchus. He is said to have refused an award for being the wisest of the Greeks.
- Bias of Priene (6th century BC) was said to have believed that "most men are bad". He is described as one of the Seven Sages of Greece.
- Boton of Athens (6th century BC) was named by Diogenes Laeritus as a teacher of Xenophanes.
- Chilon of Sparta (6th century BC) believed that the greatest achievement by humans is to determine the future using reason. He is sometimes described as one of the Seven Sages of Greece and is believed to have been the father of the Pythagorean Cheilonis.
- Lasus of Hermione (6th century BC) was a poet sometimes described as one of the Seven Sages of Greece.
- Leo of Phlius (6th century BC) was a ruler of Phlius who associated with Pythagoras.
- Leophantus (6th century BC), from either Ephesus or Lebedus, was sometimes described as one of the Seven Sages of Greece.
- Onomacritus (6th century BC) was involved in divination and Cretan law.
- Pamphilus (6th century BC) was listed by Dicaearchus as one of the Seven Sages of Greece.
- Pherecydes of Syros (6th century BC) described the origin of the gods. He is said to have owned books from Phoenicia and to have been the first Greek prose writer. He is attributed as the student of Pittacus of Mytilene and an instructor of Pythagoras.
- Pisistratus (6th century BC) was a ruler of Athens who is sometimes described as one of the Seven Sages of Greece.
- Theagenes of Rhegium (6th century BC) argued that myths are allegories and the world can be explained by natural means.
- Acusilaus (6th and 5th centuries BC) was a genealogist who followed the work of Hesiod. He is referenced alongside the pre-Socratic philosophers by Diogenes Laertius but had no meaningful influence on any school of philosophy. He was sometimes grouped among the Seven Sages of Greece.
- Epimenides (6th and 5th centuries BC) is a legendary figure who is said to have studied magic and engaged in supernatural religious practices. According to Diogenes Laertius, he wrote a theogony describing the gods. His ideas on the gods are associated with Orphism. It is unclear when he existed relative to the Milesians, and they may already have been active by the time he wrote his theogony. He is sometimes described as one of the Seven Sages of Greece.
- Pindar (6th and 5th centuries BC) was a writer who celebrated successful athletes of the time. He believed that happiness is achieved through glory and victory, which indicated the favour of the gods, but was lost through hubris.
- Theognis of Megara (6th and 5th centuries BC) was a poet who commented on social change and the redistribution of wealth as the Greek aristocracy declined.
- Phocus of Samos (date unknown) is alleged to have written the Nautical Astronomy, which is also attributed to Thales.
- Tyrtaeus was an early writer to consider ethics.
