= Pre-Socratic philosophy =

Greek philosophers active before and during the time of Socrates

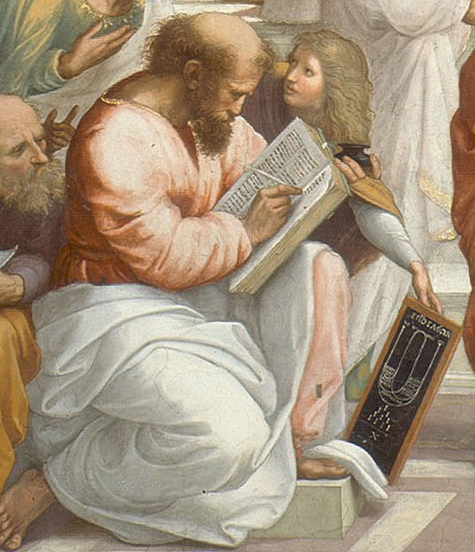
Pythagoras

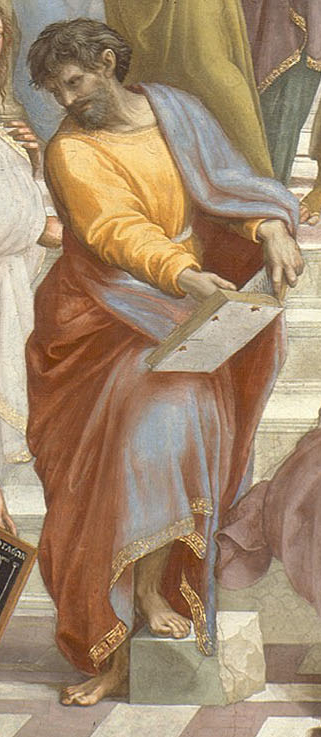
Parmenides

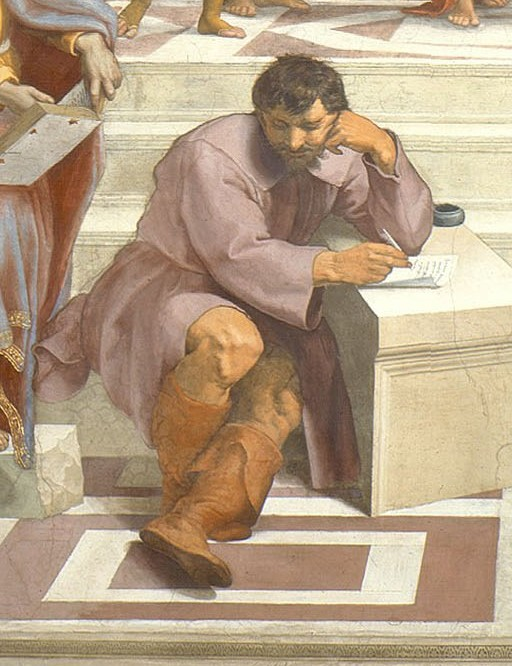
Heraclitus

Pre-Socratic philosophy, also known as early Greek philosophy, is ancient Greek philosophy before Socrates. Pre-Socratic philosophers were mostly interested in cosmology, the beginning and the substance of the universe, but the inquiries of these early philosophers spanned the workings of the natural world as well as human society, ethics, and religion. They sought explanations based on natural law rather than the actions of gods. Their work and writing has been almost entirely lost. Knowledge of their views comes from testimonia, i.e. later authors' discussions of the work of pre-Socratics. Philosophy found fertile ground in the ancient Greek world because of the close ties with neighboring civilizations and the rise of autonomous civil entities, poleis.

Pre-Socratic philosophy began in the 6th century BC with the three Milesians: Thales, Anaximander, and Anaximenes. They all attributed the arche (a word that could take the meaning of "origin", "substance" or "principle") of the world to, respectively, water, apeiron (the unlimited), and air. Another three pre-Socratic philosophers came from nearby Ionian towns: Xenophanes, Heraclitus, and Pythagoras. Xenophanes is known for his critique of the anthropomorphism of gods. Heraclitus, who was notoriously difficult to understand, is known for his maxim on impermanence, ta panta rhei, and for attributing fire to be the arche of the world. Pythagoras created a cult-like following that advocated that the universe was made up of numbers. The Eleatic school (Parmenides, Zeno of Elea, and Melissus) followed in the 5th century BC. Parmenides claimed that only one thing exists and nothing can change. Zeno and Melissus mainly defended Parmenides' opinion. Anaxagoras and Empedocles offered a pluralistic account of how the universe was created. Leucippus and Democritus are known for their atomism, and their views that only void and matter exist. The Sophists advanced philosophical relativism. The Pre-Socratics have had significant impact on several concepts of Western philosophy, such as naturalism and rationalism, and paved the way for scientific methodology.

== Terminology ==
Pre-Socratic is a term adopted in the 19th century to refer to this group of philosophers. It was first used by the German philosopher J.A. Eberhard as vorsokratische Philosophie in the late 18th century. In earlier literature they were referred to as physikoi ("physicists", after physis, "nature"), and their activity, as physiologoi (physical or natural philosophers), with this usage arising with Aristotle to differentiate them from theologoi (theologians) and mythologoi (storytellers and bards who conveyed Greek mythology), who attributed a lot of natural phenomena to the gods.

The term was coined to highlight a fundamental change in philosophical inquiries between the philosophers who lived before Socrates — who were interested in the structure of nature and cosmos (the universe), with the implication that the universe had order to it) — and Socrates and his successors, who were mostly interested in ethics and politics. The term comes with drawbacks, as several of the pre-Socratics were highly interested in ethics and how to live the best life. Further, the term implies that the pre-Socratics are less significant than Socrates, or even that they were merely a stage (implying teleology) to classical era philosophy. The term is also chronologically inaccurate, as the last of the pre-Socratics were contemporaries of Socrates.

According to James Warren, the distinction between the pre-Socratic philosophers and the philosophers of the classical era is demarcated not so much by Socrates, but by geography and what texts survived. The shift from the pre-Socratic to the classical periods involves a shift from philosophers being dispersed throughout the Greek-speaking world to their being concentrated in Athens. Further, starting in the classical period we have complete surviving texts, whereas in the pre-Socratic era we have only fragments. Scholar André Laks distinguishes two traditions of separating pre-Socratics from Socratics, dating back to the classical era and running through current times. The first tradition is the Socratic-Ciceronian, which uses the content of their philosophical inquires to divide the two groups: the pre-Socratics were interested in nature whereas Socrates focused on human affairs. The other tradition, the Platonic-Aristotelian, emphasizes method as the distinction between the two groups, as Socrates moved to a better, epistemological approach of studying various concepts. Because of the drawbacks of the term pre-Socratic, early Greek philosophy is also used, most commonly in English language philosophical literature.

André Laks and Glenn W. Most have especially popularized this shift in describing the era as "early Greek philosophy" over "pre-Socratic philosophy" through their comprehensive, nine volume Loeb editions of Early Greek Philosophy. In their first volume, they distinguish their systematic approach from that of Hermann Diels, beginning with the choice of "early Greek philosophy" over "pre-Socratic philosophy" most notably because Socrates is contemporary and sometimes even prior to philosophers traditionally considered "pre-Socratic" (such as the Atomists).

== Sources ==
Very few fragments of the works of the pre-Socratic philosophers have survived. The knowledge we have of the pre-Socratics derives from the accounts of later writers such as Plato, Aristotle, Plutarch, Diogenes Laërtius, Stobaeus, and Simplicius, and some early Christian theologians, especially Clement of Alexandria and Hippolytus of Rome. Many of the works are titled Peri Physeos, or On Nature, a title probably attributed later by other authors. These accounts, known as testimonia (testimonies), often come from biased writers. Consequently, it is sometimes difficult to determine the actual line of argument some pre-Socratics used in supporting their views. Adding more difficulty to their interpretation is the obscure language they used. Plato paraphrased the pre-Socratics and showed no interest in accurately representing their views. Aristotle was more accurate, but saw them under the scope of his philosophy. Theophrastus, Aristotle's successor, wrote an encyclopedic book Opinion of the Physicists that was the standard work about the pre-Socratics in ancient times. It is now lost, but Simplicius relied on it heavily in his accounts.

In 1903, the German professors H. Diels and W. Kranz published Die Fragmente der Vorsokratiker (The Fragments of the pre-Socratics), which collected all of the known fragments. Scholars now use this book to reference the fragments using a coding scheme called Diels–Kranz numbering. The first two characters of the scheme are "DK" for Diels and Kranz. Next is a number representing a specific philosopher. After that is a code regarding whether the fragment is a testimonia, coded as "A", or "B" if is a direct quote from the philosopher. Last is a number assigned to the fragment, which may include a decimal to reflect specific lines of a fragment. For example, "DK59B12.3" identifies line 3 of Anaxagoras fragment 12. A similar way of referring to quotes is the system prefixed with "LM" by André Laks and Glenn W. Most who edited Early Greek Philosophy in 2016.

Collectively, these fragments are called doxography (derived from the latin doxographus; derived from the Greek word for "opinion" doxa).

== Historical background ==
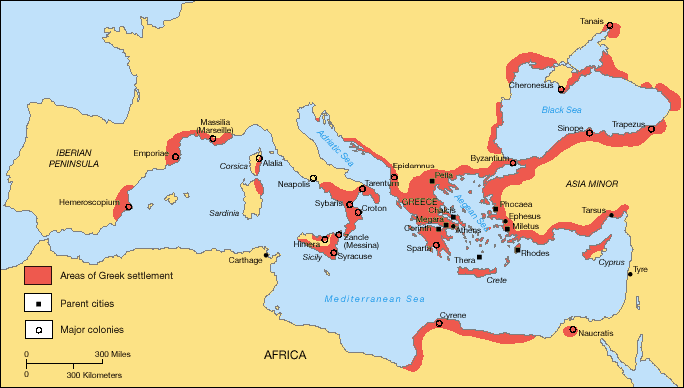
Map of Greek territories and colonies during the Archaic period (800–480 BC)

Philosophy emerged in ancient Greece in the 6th century BC. The pre-Socratic era lasted about two centuries, during which the expanding Persian Achaemenid Empire was stretching to the west, while the Greeks were advancing in trade and sea routes, reaching Cyprus and Syria. The first pre-Socratics lived in Ionia, on the western coast of Anatolia. Persians conquered the towns of Ionia c. 540 BC and Persian tyrants then ruled them. The Greeks revolted in 499 BC, but ultimately were defeated in 494 BC. Slowly but steadily Athens became the philosophical center of Greece by the middle of the fifth century. Athens was entering its Classical Era, with philosophers such as Socrates, Plato, and Aristotle, but the impact of the pre-Socratics continued.

Several factors contributed to the birth of pre-Socratic philosophy in Ancient Greece. Ionian towns, especially Miletus, had close trade relations with Egypt and Mesopotamia, cultures with observations about the natural world that differed from those of the Greeks. Apart from technical skills and cultural influences, of paramount significance was that the Greeks acquired the alphabet c. 800 BC.

Another factor was the ease and frequency of intra-Greek travel, which led to the blending and comparison of ideas. During the sixth century BC, various philosophers and other thinkers moved easily around Greece, especially visiting pan-Hellenic festivals. While long-distance communication was difficult during ancient times, persons, philosophers, and books moved through other parts of the Greek peninsula, the Aegean islands, and Magna Graecia, a coastal area in Southern Italy.

The democratic political system of independent poleis also contributed to the rise of philosophy. Most Greek towns were not ruled by autocrats or priests, allowing citizens to question freely a wide range of issues. Various poleis flourished and became wealthy, especially Miletus. which was a centre of trade and production during the early phases of pre-Socratic philosophy. Trade of grain, oil, wine, and other commodities among each polis and colonies meant these towns were not isolated but embedded – and economically dependent – on a complex and changeable web of trade routes.

Greek mythology also influenced the birth of philosophy. The philosophers' ideas, were, to a certain extent, answers to questions that were subtly present in the work of Homer and Hesiod. The pre-Socratics arose from a world dominated by myths, sacred places, and local deities. The work of epic poets such as Homer, Hesiod and others reflected this environment. They are considered predecessors of the pre-Socratics since they seek to address the origin of the world and to organize traditional folklore and legends systematically. Greek popular religion contained many features of the religions of neighboring civilizations, such as the Egyptians, Mesopotamians, and Hittites. The first pre-Socratic philosophers also traveled extensively to other lands, meaning that pre-Socratic thought had roots abroad as well as domestically.

Homer, in his two epic poems, not only personifies gods and other natural phenomena, such as the Night, but he hints at some views on the origin and the nature of the world that came under scrutiny by the pre-Socratics. In his epic poem Theogony (literally meaning the birth of gods) Hesiod (c. 700 BC) describes the origin of gods, and apart from the solid mythical structure, one can notice an attempt towards organizing beliefs using some form of rationalization; an example would be that Night gives birth to Death, Sleep and Dreams. Transmigration of life, a belief of the Orphics, a religious cult originating from Thrace, had affected the thought of the 5th century BC but the overall influence of their cosmology on philosophy is disputed. Pherecydes, a poet, magician, and contemporary of Thales, in his book describes a particular cosmogony, asserting that three gods pre-existed – a step towards rationality.

== General features ==
List of major pre-Socratic philosophers and when they flourished (according to Catherine Osborne)
| Philosophers | Flourished (year BC) |
|---|---|
| Thales | 585 |
| Anaximander | 550 |
| Anaximenes | 545 |
| Pythagoras | 530 |
| Xenophanes | 530 |
| Heraclitus | 500 |
| Parmenides | 500 |
| Zenon | 450 |
| Aspasia | 450 |
| Anaxagoras | 450 |
| Empedocles | 445 |
| Melissus | 440 |
| Protagoras | 440 |
| Leukippus | 435 |
| Gorgias | 430 |
| Antiphon | 430 |
| Democritus | 420 |
| Philolaus | 420 |
| Socrates | 420 |
| Plato | 380 |
| Aristotle | 350 |

The most important feature of pre-Socratic philosophy was the use of reason to explain the universe. The pre-Socratic philosophers shared the intuition that there was a single explanation that could explain both the plurality and the singularity of the whole – and that explanation would not be direct actions of the gods. The pre-Socratic philosophers rejected traditional mythological explanations of the phenomena they saw around them in favor of more rational explanations, initiating analytic and critical thought. Their efforts were directed at the investigation of the ultimate basis and essential nature of the external world. Many sought the material principle (arche) of things, and the method of their origin and disappearance. They emphasized the rational unity of things and rejected supernatural explanations, seeking natural principles at work in the world and human society. The pre-Socratics saw the world as a cosmos, an ordered arrangement that could be understood via rational inquiry. In their effort to make sense of the cosmos they coined new terms and concepts such as rhythm, symmetry, analogy, deductionism, reductionism, mathematization of nature and others.

An important term that is met in the thought of several pre-Socratic philosophers is arche. Depending on the context, it can take various related meanings. It could mean the beginning or origin with the undertone that there is an effect on the things to follow. Also, it might mean a principle or a cause (especially in Aristotelian tradition).

A common feature of the pre-Socratics is the absence of empiricism and experimentation in order to prove their theories. This may have been because of a lack of instruments, or because of a tendency to view the world as a unity, undeconstructable, so it would be impossible for an external eye to observe tiny fractions of nature under experimental control.

According to Jonathan Barnes, a professor of ancient philosophy, pre-Socratic philosophy exhibits three significant features: they were internal, systematic and economical. Internal meaning they tried to explain the world with characteristics found within this world. Systematic because they tried to universalize their findings. Economical because they tried to invoke only a few new terms. Based on these features, they reached their most significant achievement: they changed the course of human thought from myth to philosophy and science.

The pre-Socratics were not atheists; however, they minimized the extent of the gods' involvement in natural phenomena such as thunder or totally eliminated the gods from the natural world.

Pre-Socratic philosophy encompasses the first of the three phases of ancient Greek philosophy, which spanned around a thousand years. The pre-Socratic phase itself is divided into three phases. The first phase of pre-Socratic philosophy, mainly the Milesians, Xenophanes, and Heraclitus, consisted of rejecting traditional cosmogony and attempting to explain nature based on empirical observations and interpretations. A second phase – that of the Eleatics – resisted the idea that change or motion can happen. Based on their radical monism, they believed that only one substance exists and forms Kosmos. The Eleatics were also monists (believing that only one thing exists and everything else is just a transformation of it). In the third phase, the post-Eleatics (mainly Empedocles, Anaxagoras, and Democritus) opposed most Eleatic teaching and returned to the naturalism of the Milesians.

The pre-Socratics were succeeded by the second phase of ancient philosophy, where the philosophical movements of Platonism, Cynicism, Cyrenaicism, Aristotelianism, Pyrrhonism, Epicureanism, Academic skepticism, and Stoicism rose to prominence until 100 BC. In the third phase, philosophers studied their predecessors.

== Pre-Socratic philosophers ==
Graphical relationship among the various pre-socratic philosophers and thinkers; red arrows indicate a relationship of opposition.

=== Milesian beginning: Thales, Anaximander and Anaximenes ===
The Milesian school was located in Miletus, Ionia, in the 6th century BC. It consisted of Thales, Anaximander, and Anaximenes, who most probably had a teacher-pupil relationship. They were mainly occupied with the origin and substance of the world; each of them attributed the Whole to a single arche (beginning or principle), starting the tradition of naturalistic monism.

==== Thales ====
Thales's theorem: if A̅C̅ is a diameter and B is a point on the diameter's circle, the angle ABC is a right angle.

Thales (c. 624–546 BC) is considered to be the father of philosophy. None of his writings have survived. He is considered the first western philosopher since he was the first to use reason, to use proof, and to generalize. He created the word cosmos, the first word to describe the universe. He contributed to geometry and predicted the eclipse of 585 BC. Thales may have been of Phoenician ancestry. Miletus was a meeting point and trade centre of the then great civilizations, and Thales visited the neighbouring civilizations, Egypt, Mesopotamia, Crete, and Phoenicia. In Egypt, geometry was advanced as a means of separating agricultural fields. Thales, though, advanced geometry with his abstract deductive reasoning reaching universal generalizations. Proclus, a later Athenian philosopher, attributed the theorem now known as Thales's theorem to Thales. He is also known for being the first to claim that the base angles of isosceles triangles are equal, and that a diameter bisects the circle. Like many Greeks of the time, Thales visited Sardis, where astronomical records were kept, and used astronomical observations for practical matters (oil harvesting). Thales was widely considered a genius in ancient times and was revered as one of the Seven Sages of Greece.

Most importantly, what marks Thales as the first philosopher is the posing of the fundamental philosophical question about the origin and the substance of the world, while providing an answer based on empirical evidence and reasoning. He attributed the origin of the world to an element instead of a divine being. Our knowledge of Thales' claim derives from Aristotle. Aristotle, while discussing opinions of previous philosophers, tells us that "Thales, the founder of this type of philosophy, says the principle (arche) is water." What he meant by arche is a matter of interpretation (it might be the origin, the element, or an ontological matrix), but regardless of the various interpretations, he conceived the world as One thing instead of a collection of various items and speculated on the binding/original elements.

Another important aspect of Thales' philosophy is his claim that everything is full of gods. What he meant by this is again a matter of interpretation; views range from theistic to atheistic. But the most plausible explanation, suggested by Aristotle, is that Thales was advocating a theory of hylozoism: that the universe, the sum of all things that exist, is divine and alive. Another notable claim made by Thales is that earth "rests on water". It has been suggested that he came to this conclusion after observing fish fossils on land.

==== Anaximander ====
That from which all things are born
the beginning of all things
the first foundation of things is the Unlimited (apeiron);
The source from which coming-to-be is, for things that are, and for
their passing away in accordance with necessity.
For they give justice and pay retribution to each other for their mutual
injustice according to the ordered process of time.

— Anaximander, DK 12 B 1, preserved fragment of On Nature

Anaximander (610–546 BC), also from Miletus, was 25 years younger than Thales. He was a member of the elite of Miletus, wealthy and a statesman. He showed interest in many fields, including mathematics and geography. He drew the first map of the world, was the first to conclude that the earth is spherical, and made instruments to mark time, something like a clock. In response to Thales, he postulated as the first principle an undefined, unlimited substance without qualities (apeiron), out of which the primary opposites, hot and cold, moist and dry, became differentiated. His answer was an attempt to explain observable changes by attributing them to a single source that transforms to various elements. Like Thales, he provided a naturalistic explanation for phenomena previously given supernatural explanations. He is also known for speculating on the origin of mankind. He proclaimed that the earth is not situated in another structure but lies unsupported in the middle of the universe. Further, he developed a rudimentary evolutionary explanation for biodiversity in which constant universal powers affected the lives of animals. According to Giorgio de Santillana, a philosophy professor at the Massachusetts Institute of Technology, Anaximander's conception of a universe governed by laws shaped the philosophical thinking of centuries to come and was as important as the discovery of fire or Einstein's breakthroughs in science.

==== Anaximenes ====
Little is known of Anaximenes' (585–525 BC) life. He was a younger contemporary and friend of Anaximander, and the two worked together on various intellectual projects. He also wrote a book on nature in prose. Anaximenes took for his principle aēr (air), conceiving it as being modified, via thickening and thinning, into the other classical elements: fire, wind, clouds, water, and earth. While his theory resembled that of Anaximander, as they both claimed a single source of the universe, Anaximenes suggested sophisticated mechanisms in which air is transformed to other elements, mainly because of changes of density. Since the classical era, he was considered the father of naturalistic explanations. Anaximenes expanded Anaximander's attempt to find a unitary cause explaining natural phenomena both living and nonliving, without, according to James Warren, having to "reduce living things in some way to mere locations of material change".

=== Xenophanes ===
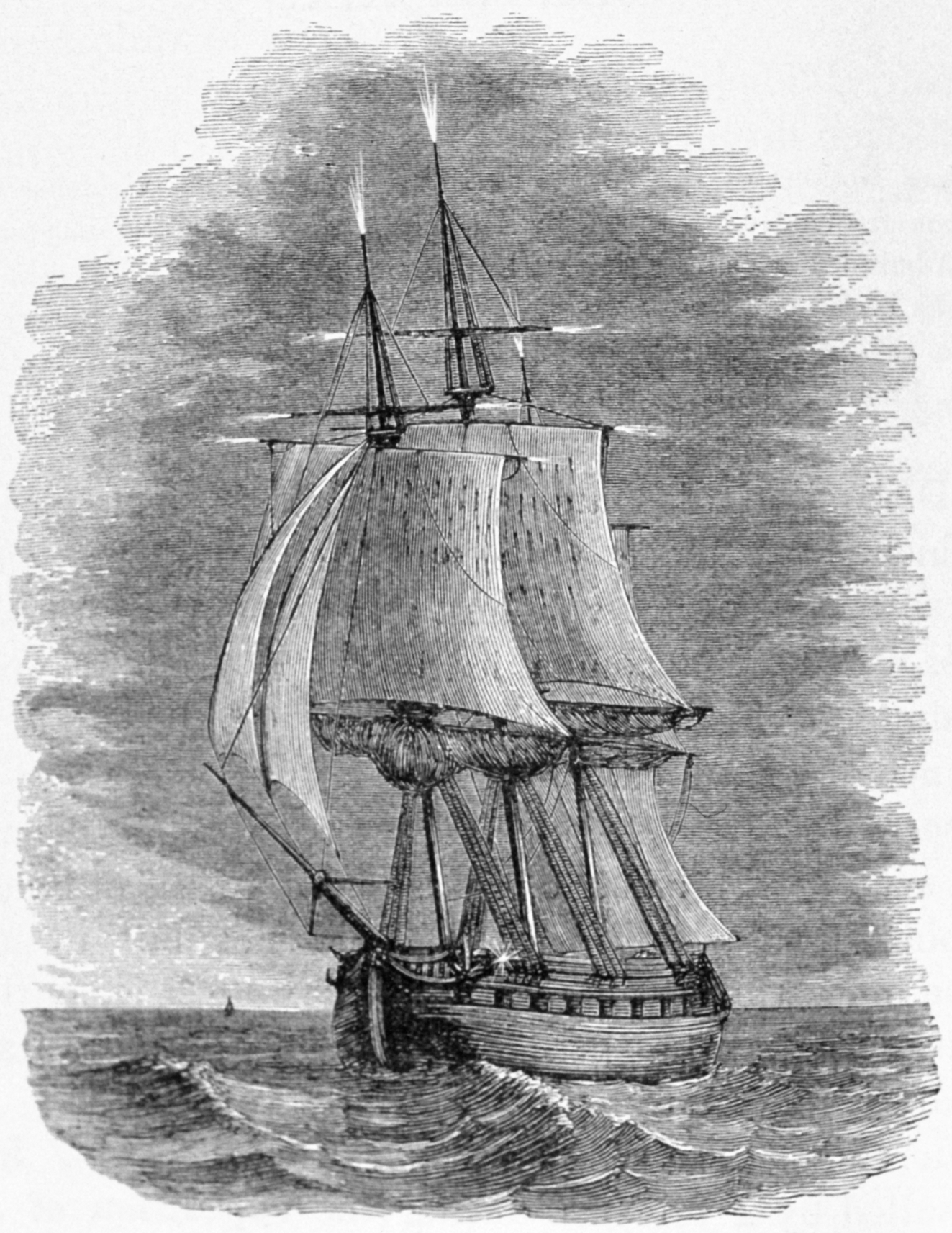
St. Elmo's fire (luminous plasma created by a corona discharge from a rod-like object) in a ship. Xenophanes' contemporaries attributed this phenomenon to the deity Dioscuri. Xenophanes argued that the observed illumination is due to small clouds influenced by special circumstances relating to stars—an example of naturalism and reductionism.

Xenophanes was born in Colophon, an Ionian town near Miletus. He was a well-traveled poet whose primary interests were theology and epistemology. Concerning theology, he pointed out that we did not know whether there was one god or many gods, or in such case whether there was a hierarchy among them. To critique the anthropomorphic representation of the gods by his contemporary Greeks, he pointed out that different nations depicted their gods as looking like themselves. He famously said that if oxen, horses, or lions could draw, they would draw their gods as oxen, horses, or lions. This critique was not limited to the looks of gods but also their behaviour. Greek mythology, mostly shaped by the poets Homer and Hesiod, attributed moral failures such as jealousy and adultery to the gods. Xenophanes opposed this. He thought gods must be morally superior to humans. Xenophanes, however, never claimed the gods were omnipotent, omnibenevolent, or omniscient. Xenophanes also offered naturalistic explanations for phenomena such as the sun, the rainbow and St. Elmo's fire. Traditionally these were attributed to divine intervention but according to Xenophanes they were actually effects of clouds. These explanations of Xenophanes indicate empiricism in his thought and might constitute a kind of proto-scientism. Scholars have overlooked his cosmology and naturalism since Aristotle (maybe due to Xenophanes' lack of teleology) until recently. Concerning epistemology, Xenophanes questioned the validity of human knowledge. Humans usually tend to assert their beliefs are real and represent truth. While Xenophanes was a pessimist about the capability of humans to reach knowledge, he also believed in gradual progress through critical thinking. Xenophanes tried to find naturalistic explanations for meteorological and cosmological phenomena.

Ancient philosophy historian Alexander Mourelatos notes Xenophanes used a pattern of thought that is still in use by modern metaphysics. Xenophanes, by reducing meteorological phenomena to clouds, created an argument that "X in reality is Y", for example B32, "What they call Iris [the rainbow] that too is in reality a cloud: one that appears to the eye as purple, red, and green. This is still use[d] today 'lightning is massive electrical discharge' or 'items such as tables are a cloud of micro-particles'." Mourelatos comments that the type of analogy that the cloud analogy is remains present in scientific language and "...is the modern philosopher's favourite subject for illustrations of inter-theoretic identity".

According to Aristotle and Diogenes Laertius, Xenophanes was Parmenides' teacher; but is a matter of debate in current literature whether Xenophanes should also be considered an Eleatic.

=== Heraclitus ===
The hallmark of Heraclitus' philosophy is flux. In fragment DK B30, Heraclitus writes: This world-order [Kosmos], the same of all, no god nor man did create, but it ever was and is and will be: everliving fire, kindling in measures and being quenched in measures. Heraclitus posited that all things in nature are in a state of perpetual flux. Like previous monist philosophers, Heraclitus claimed that the arche of the world was fire, which was subject to change – that makes him a materialist monist. From fire all things originate and all things return to it again in a process of eternal cycles. Fire becomes water and earth and vice versa. These everlasting modifications explain his view that the cosmos was and is and will be. The idea of continual flux is also met in the "river fragments". There, Heraclitus claims we can not step into the same river twice, a position summarized with the slogan ta panta rhei (everything flows). One fragment reads: "Into the same rivers we both step and do not step; we both are and are not" (DK 22 B49a). Heraclitus is seemingly suggesting that not only the river is constantly changing, but we do as well, even hinting at existential questions about humankind.

Another key concept of Heraclitus is that opposites somehow mirror each other, a doctrine called unity of opposites. Two fragments relating to this concept state, "As the same thing in us is living and dead, waking and sleeping, young and old. For these things having changed around are those, and those in turn having changed around are these" (B88) and "Cold things warm up, the hot cools off, wet becomes dry, dry becomes wet" (B126). Heraclitus' doctrine on the unity of opposites suggests that unity of the world and its various parts is kept through the tension produced by the opposites. Furthermore, each polar substance contains its opposite, in a continual circular exchange and motion that results in the stability of the cosmos. Another of Heraclitus' famous axioms highlights this doctrine (B53): "War is father of all and king of all; and some he manifested as gods, some as men; some he made slaves, some free", where war means the creative tension that brings things into existence.

A fundamental idea in Heraclitus is logos, an ancient Greek word with a variety of meanings; Heraclitus might have used a different meaning of the word with each usage in his book. Logos seems like a universal law that unites the cosmos, according to a fragment: "Listening not to me but to the logos, it is wise to agree (homologein) that all things are one" (DK 22 B50). While logos is everywhere, very few people are familiar with it. B 19 reads: [hoi polloi] "...do not know how to listen [to Logos] or how to speak [the truth]". Heraclitus' thought on logos influenced the Stoics, who referred to him to support their belief that rational law governs the universe.

=== Pythagoreanism ===
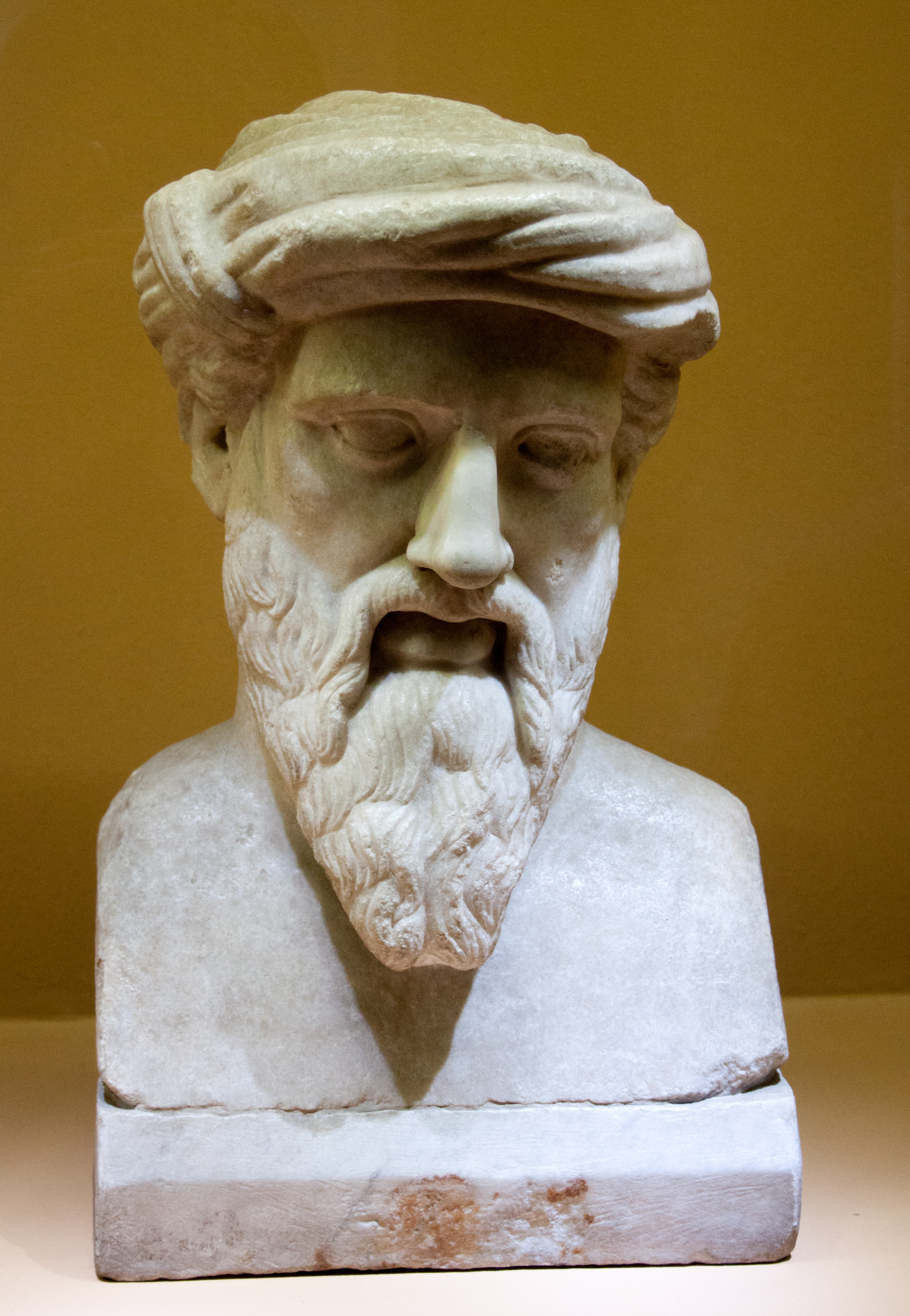
Pythagoras

Pythagoras (582–496 BC) was born on Samos, a small island near Miletus. He moved to Croton at about age 30, where he established his school and acquired political influence. Some decades later he had to flee Croton and relocate to Metapontum.

Pythagoras was famous for studying numbers and the geometrical relations of numbers. A large following of Pythagoreans adopted and extended his doctrine. They advanced his ideas, reaching the claim that everything consists of numbers, the universe is made by numbers and everything is a reflection of analogies and geometrical relations. Numbers, music and philosophy, all interlinked, could comfort the beauty-seeking human soul and hence Pythagoreans espoused the study of mathematics.

Pythagorianism perceived the world as perfect harmony, dependent on number, and aimed at inducing humankind likewise to lead a harmonious life, including ritual and dietary recommendations. Their way of life was ascetic, restraining themselves from various pleasures and food. They were vegetarians and placed enormous value on friendship. Pythagoras politically was an advocate of a form of aristocracy, a position which later Pythagoreans rejected, but generally, they were reactionary and notably repressed women. Other pre-Socratic philosophers mocked Pythagoras for his belief in reincarnation.

Notable Pythagorians included Philolaus (470-380 BC), Alcmaeon of Croton, Archytas (428-347 BC) and Echphantus. The most notable was Alcmaeon, a medical and philosophical writer. Alcmaeon noticed that most organs in the body come in pairs and suggested that human health depends on harmony between opposites (hot/cold, dry/wet), and illness is due to an imbalance of them. He was the first to think of the brain as the center of senses and thinking. Philolaus advanced cosmology through his discovery of heliocentricism – the idea that the Sun lies in the middle of the Earth's orbit and other planets.

Pythagoreanism influenced later Christian currents as Neoplatonism, and its pedagogical methods were adapted by Plato. Furthermore, there seems to be a continuity in some aspects of Plato's philosophy. As Carl A. Huffman notes, Plato had a tendency to invoke mathematics in explaining natural phenomena, and he also believed in the immortality, even divinity of the human soul.

=== The Eleatics: Parmenides, Zeno and Melissus ===
The Eleatic school is named after Elea, an ancient Greek town on the southern Italian Peninsula. Parmenides is considered the founder of the school. Other eminent Eleatics include Zeno of Elea and Melissus of Samos. According to Aristotle and Diogenes Laertius, Xenophanes was Parmenides' teacher, and it is debated whether Xenophanes should also be considered an Eleatic. Parmenides was born in Elea to a wealthy family around 515 BC. Parmenides of Elea was interested in many fields, such as biology and astronomy. He was the first to deduce that the earth is spherical. He was also involved in his town's political life.

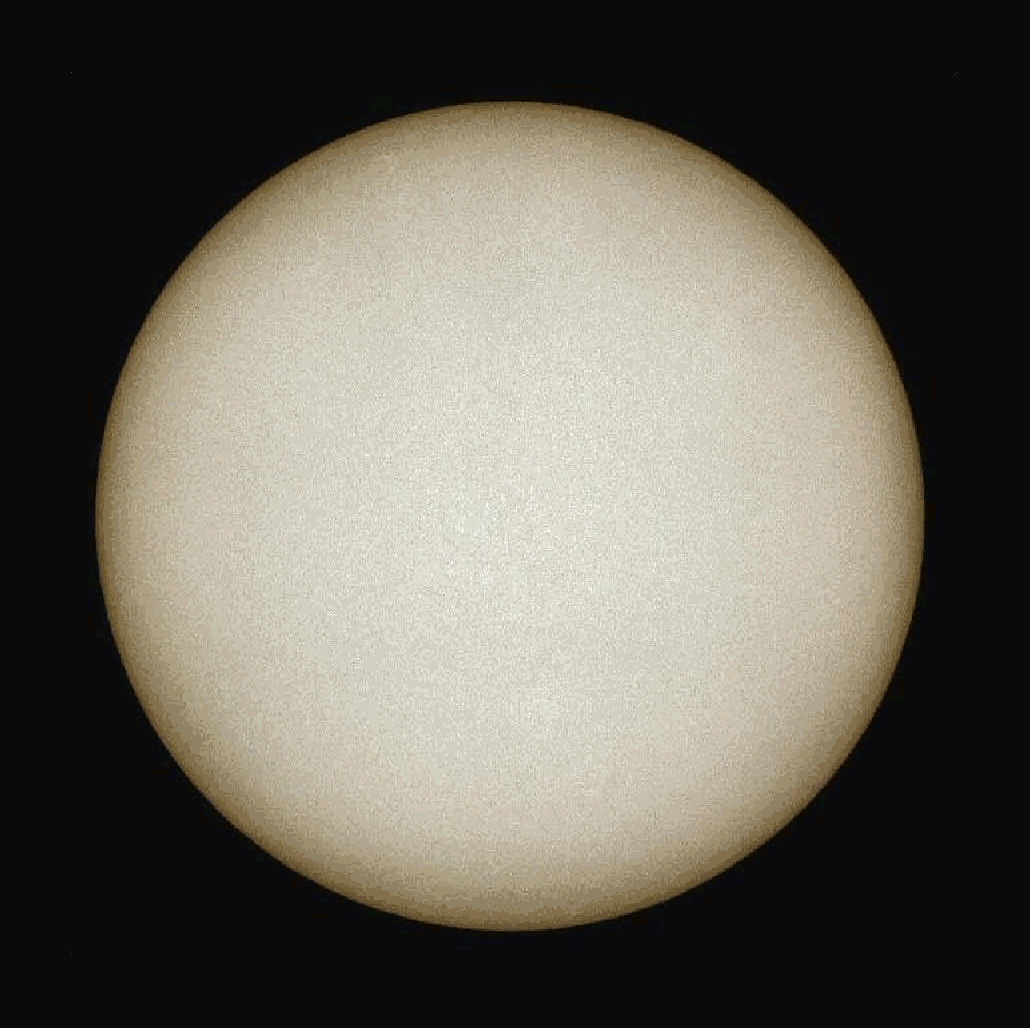
According to Parmenides, Being, what exists, is like the mass of a perfect sphere: undifferentiated, indivisible, and unchangeable.

Parmenides' contributions were paramount not only to ancient philosophy but to all of western metaphysics and ontology. Parmenides wrote a hard to interpret poem, named On Nature or On What-is, that substantially influenced later Greek philosophy. Only 150 fragments of this poem survive. It tells a story of a young man (kouros in ancient Greek) dedicated to finding the truth carried by a goddess on a long journey to the heavens. The poem consists of three parts, the proem (i.e., preface), the Way of Truth and the Way of Opinion. Very few pieces from the Way of Opinion survive. In that part, Parmenides must have been dealing with cosmology, judging from other authors' references. The Way of Truth was then, and is still today, considered of much more importance. In the Way of Truth, the goddess criticizes the logic of people who do not distinguish the real from the non-existent ("What-is" and "What-is-Not"). In this poem Parmenides unfolds his philosophy: that all things are One, and therefore nothing can be changed or altered. Hence, all the things that we think to be true, even ourselves, are false representations. What-is, according to Parmenides, is a physical sphere that is unborn, unchanged, and infinite. This is a monist vision of the world, far more radical than that of Heraclitus. The goddess teaches Kouros to use his reasoning to understand whether various claims are true or false, discarding senses as fallacious. Other fundamental issues raised by Parmenides' poem are the doctrine that nothing comes from nothing and the unity of being and thinking. As quoted by DK fragment 3: To gar auto noein estin te kai einai (For to think and to be is one and the same).

Zeno and Melissus continued Parmenides' thought on cosmology. Zeno is mostly known for his paradoxes, i.e., self-contradictory statements which served as proofs that Parmenides' monism was valid, and that pluralism was invalid. The most common theme of those paradoxes involved traveling a distance, but since that distance comprises infinite points, the traveler could never accomplish it. His most famous is the Achilles paradox, which is mentioned by Aristotelis: "The second is called the 'Achilles' and says that the slowest runner will never be caught by the fastest, because it is necessary for the pursuer first to arrive at the point from which the pursued set off, so it is necessary that the slower will always be a little ahead." (Aristotle Phys. 239b14–18 [DK 29 A26]) Melissus defended and advanced Parmenides' theory using prose, without invoking divinity or mythical figures. He tried to explain why humans think various non-existent objects exist.

The Eleatics' focus on Being through means of logic initiated the philosophical discipline of ontology. Other philosophers influenced by the Eleatics (such as the Sophists, Plato, and Aristotle) further advanced logic, argumentation, mathematics and especially elenchos (proof). The Sophists even placed Being under the scrutiny of elenchos. Because of the Eleatics reasoning was acquiring a formal method.

=== The Pluralists: Anaxagoras and Empedocles ===
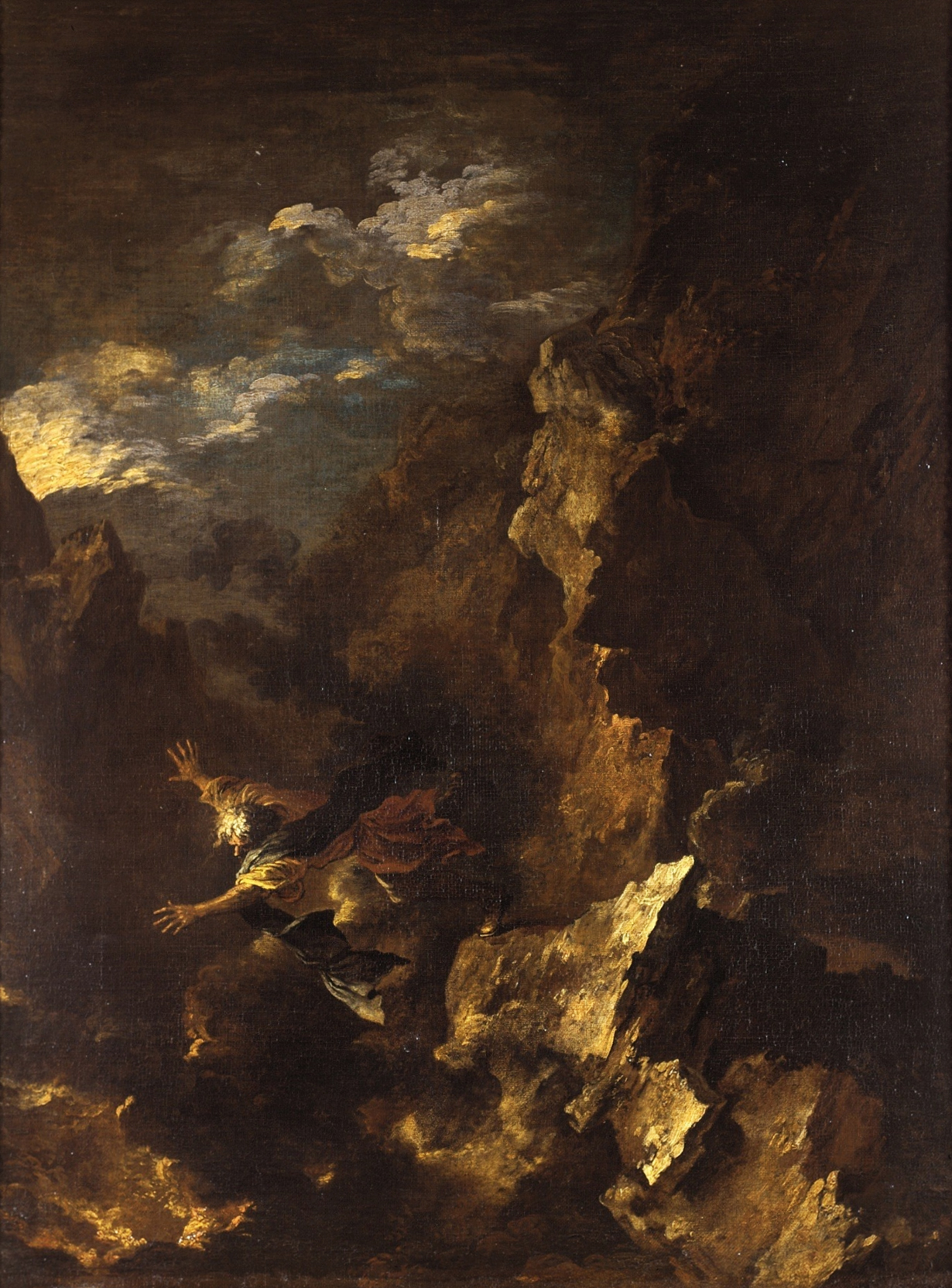
The Death of Empedocles by Salvator Rosa. Legend holds that Empedocles committed suicide by falling into Mount Etna's volcano.

The Pluralist school marked a return to Milesian natural philosophy, though much more refined because of Eleatic criticism.

Anaxagoras was born in Ionia, but was the first major philosopher to emigrate to Athens. He was soon associated with the Athenian statesman Pericles and, probably due to this association, was accused by a political opponent of Pericles for impiety as Anaxagoras held that the sun was not associated with divinity; it was merely a huge burning stone. Pericles helped Anaxagoras flee Athens and return to Ionia. Anaxagoras was also a major influence on Socrates.

Anaxagoras is known for his "theory of everything". He claimed that "in everything there is a share of everything." Interpretations differ as to what he meant. Anaxagoras was trying to stay true to the Eleatic principle of the everlasting (What-is) while also explaining the diversity of the natural world. Anaxagoras accepted Parmenides' doctrine that everything that exists (What-is) has existed forever, but contrary to the Eleatics, he added the ideas of panspermia and nous. All objects were mixtures of various elements, such as air, water, and others. One special element was nous, i.e., mind, which is present in living things and causes motion.

According to Anaxagoras, Nous was one of the elements that make up the cosmos. Things that had nous were alive. According to Anaxagoras, all things are composites of some basic elements; although it is not clear what these elements are. All objects are a mixture of these building blocks and have a portion of each element, except nous. Nous was also considered a building block of the cosmos, but it exists only in living objects. Anaxagoras writes: "In everything there is a portion (moira) of everything except mind (nous), but there are some things in which mind too is present." Nous was not just an element of things, somehow it was the cause of setting the universe into motion. Anaxagoras advanced Milesian thought on epistemology, striving to establish an explanation that could be valid for all natural phenomena. Influenced by the Eleatics, he also furthered the exploration of metatheoretical questions such as the nature of knowledge.

Empedocles was born in Akragas, a town in the southern Italian peninsula. According to Diogenes Laertius, Empedocles wrote two books in the form of poems: Peri Physeos (On nature) and the Katharmoi (Purifications). Some contemporary scholars argue these books might be one; all agree that interpreting Empedocles is difficult.

On cosmological issues, Empedocles takes from the Eleatic school the idea that the universe is unborn, has always been and always will be. He also continues Anaxagoras' thought on the four "roots" (i.e., classical elements), that by intermixing, they create all things around us. These roots are fire, air, earth, and water. Crucially, he adds two more components, the immaterial forces of Love and Strife. These two forces are opposite and by acting upon the material of the four roots unite in harmony or tear apart the four roots, with the resulting mixture being all things that exist. Empedocles uses an analogy of how this is possible: as a painter uses a few basic colors to create a painting, the same happens with the four roots. It is not quite clear if Love and Strife co-operate or have a greater plan, but Love and Strife are in a continual cycle that generates life. Other beings, apart from the four roots and Love and Strife, according to Empedocles' Purifications are mortals, gods, and daemons. Like Pythagoras, Empedocles believed in the soul's transmigration and was vegetarian.

=== Atomists: Leucippus and Democritus ===
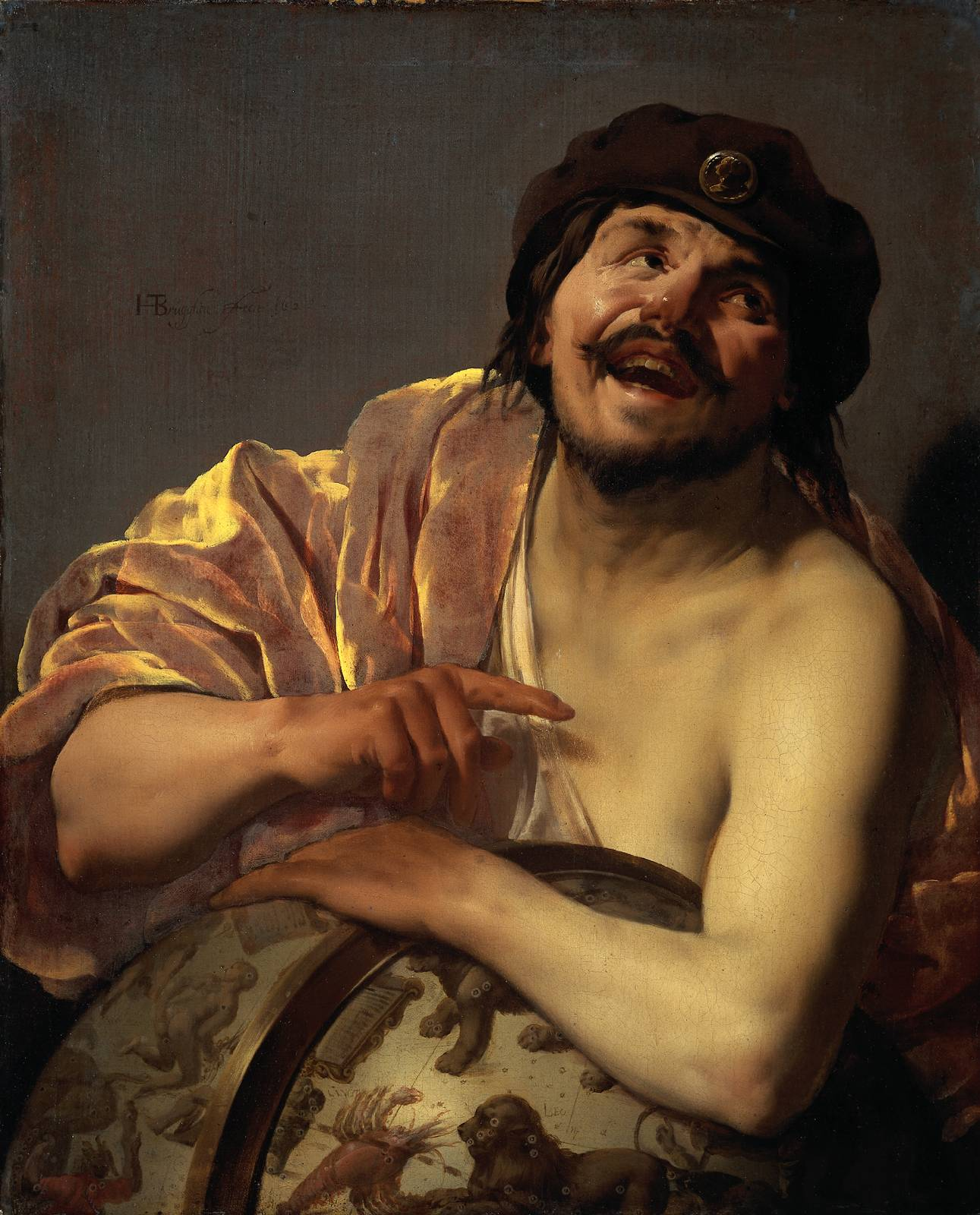
Democritus by Hendrick ter Brugghen, 1628. Democritus was known as the "laughing philosopher"

Leucippus and Democritus both lived in Abdera, in Thrace. They are most famous for their atomic cosmology even though their thought included many other fields of philosophy, such as ethics, mathematics, aesthetics, politics, and even embryology.

The atomic theory of Leucippus and Democritus was a response to the Eleatic school, who held that motion is not possible because everything is occupied with What-is. Democritus and Leucippus reverted the Eleatic axiom, claiming that since motions exist, What-is-not must also exist; hence void exists. Democritus and Leucippus were skeptics regarding the reliability of our senses, but they were confident that motion exists. Atoms, according to Democritus and Leucippus, had some characteristics of the Eleatic What-is: they were homogeneous and indivisible. These characteristics allowed answers to Zeno's paradoxes. Atoms move within the void, interact with each other, and form the plurality of the world we live in, in a purely mechanical manner.

One conclusion of the Atomists was determinism – the philosophical view that all events are determined completely by previously existing causes. As Leucippus said, (DK 67 B2) "Nothing comes to be random but everything is by reason and out of necessity." Democritus concluded that since everything is atoms and void, several of our senses are not real but conventional. Color, for example, is not a property of atoms; hence our perception of color is a convention. As Democritus said, (DK 68 B9) "By convention sweet, by convention bitter, by convention hot, by convention cold, by convention colour; in reality atoms and void." This can be interpreted in two ways. According to James Warren there is an eliminativist interpretation, such that Democritus means that color is not real, and there is a relativist interpretation, such that Democritus means that color and taste are not real but are perceived as such by our senses through sensory interaction.

=== Sophists ===
The sophists were a philosophical and educational movement that flourished in ancient Greece before Socrates. They attacked traditional thinking, from gods to morality, paving the way for further advances of philosophy and other disciplines such as drama, social sciences, mathematics, and history.

Plato disparaged the sophists, causing long-lasting harm to their reputation. Plato thought philosophy should be reserved for those who had the appropriate intellect to understand it; whereas the sophists would teach anyone who would pay tuition. The sophists taught rhetoric and how to address issues from multiple viewpoints. Since the sophists and their pupils were persuasive speakers at court or in public, they were accused of moral and epistemological relativism, which indeed some sophists appeared to advocate. Prominent sophists include Protagoras, Gorgias, Hippias, Thrasymachus, Prodicus, Callicles, Antiphon, and Critias.

Protagoras is mostly known for two of his quotes. One is that "[humans are..] the measure of all things, of things that are that they are, of things that are not that they are not" which is commonly interpreted as affirming philosophical relativism, but it can also be interpreted as claiming that knowledge is only relevant to humankind, that moral rightness and other forms of knowledge are relevant to and limited to human mind and perception. The other quote is, "Concerning the gods, I cannot ascertain whether they exist or whether they do not, or what form they have; for there are many obstacles to knowing, including the obscurity of the question and the brevity of human life."

Gorgias wrote a book named On Nature, in which he attacked the Eleatics' concepts of What-is and What-is-not. He claimed it is absurd to hold that nonexistence exists, and that What-is was impossible since it had to either be generated or be unlimited and neither is sufficient. There is an ongoing debate among modern scholars whether he was a serious thinker, a precursor of extreme relativism and skepticism, or merely a charlatan.

Antiphon placed natural law against the law of the city. One need not obey the city's laws as long as one will not get caught. One could argue that Antiphon was a careful hedonist—rejecting dangerous pleasures.

=== Philolaus of Croton and Diogenes of Apollonia ===
Philolaus of Croton and Diogenes of Apollonia from Thrace (born c. 460 BC) are considered the last generation of pre-Socratics. Rather than advancing a cosmological perspective on how our universe is constructed, they are mostly noted for advancing abstract thinking and argumentation.
Pythagorianism, Anaxagoras and Empedocles influenced Philolaus. He attempted to explain both the variety and unity of the cosmos. He addressed the need to explain how the various masses of the universe interact among them and coined the term Harmonia, a binding force that allows mass to take shape. The structure of the cosmos consisted of apeira (unlimiteds) and perainonta (limiters). Diogenes of Apollonia returned to Milesian monism, but with a rather more elegant thought. As he says in DK64 B2 "It seems to me, overall, that all things are alterations of the same things and are the same thing". He explains that things, even when changing shapes, remain ontologically the same.

== Topics ==
=== Knowledge ===
The mythologoi, Homer and Hesiod, along with other poets, centuries before the pre-Socratics, thought that true knowledge was exclusive to the divine. But starting with Xenophanes, the pre-Socratics moved towards a more natural approach to knowledge. The pre-Socratics sought a method to understand the cosmos, while being aware that there is a limit to human knowledge.

While Pythagoras and Empedocles linked their self-proclaimed wisdom to their divinely inspired status, they tried to teach or urge mortals to seek the truth about the natural realm—Pythagoras by means of mathematics and geometry and Empedocles by exposure to experiences. Xenophanes thought that human knowledge was merely an opinion that cannot be validated or proven to be true. According to Jonathan Warren, Xenophanes set the outline of the nature of knowledge. Later, Heraclitus and Parmenides stressed the capability of humans to understand how things stand in nature through direct observation, inquiry, and reflection.

=== Theology ===
Pre-Socratic thought contributed to the demythologization of the Greek popular religion. The narrative of their thought contributed to shifting the course of ancient Greek philosophy and religion away from the realm of divinity and even paved the way for teleological explanations. They attacked the traditional representations of gods that Homer and Hesiod had established and put Greek popular religion under scrutiny, initiating the schism between natural philosophy and theology. Pre-Socratic philosophers did not have atheistic beliefs, but it should be kept in mind that being an atheist those days was not without social or legal dangers. Despite that, arguments rejecting deities were not barred from the public sphere which can be seen in Protagoras's quotation on the gods: "About the gods I am able to know neither that they exist nor that they do not exist."

The theological thought starts with the Milesian philosophers. It is evident in Anaximander's idea of the apeiron steering everything, which had other abilities usually attributed to Zeus. Later, Xenophanes developed a critique of the anthropomorphism of the gods. Xenophanes set three preconditions for God: he had to be all good, immortal and not resembling humans in appearance, which had a major impact on western religious thought.

The theological thought of Heraclitus and Parmenides is not entirely certain, but it is generally accepted that they believed in some kind of divinity. The Pythagoreans and Empedocles believed in the transmigration of souls. Anaxagoras asserted that cosmic intelligence (nous) gives life to things. Diogenes of Appollonia expanded this line of thinking and might have constructed the first teleological argument "it would not be possible without Intellection for it so to be divided up that it has the measures of all things — of winter and summer and night and day and rains and winds and fair weather. The other things, too, if one wishes to consider them, one would find disposed of in the best possible way." While some pre-Socratics were trying to find alternatives to divinity, others were setting the foundation of explaining the universe in terms of teleology and intelligent design by a divine force.

=== Medicine ===
Prior to the pre-Socratics, health and illness were thought to be governed by gods. Pre-Socratic philosophy and medicine advanced in parallel, with medicine as a part of philosophy and vice versa. It was Hippocrates (often hailed as the father of medicine) who separated – but not completely – the two domains. Physicians incorporated pre-Socratic philosophical ideas about the nature of the world in their theoretical framework, blurring the border between the two domains. An example is the study of epilepsy, which in popular religion was thought to be a divine intervention to human life, but Hippocrates' school attributed it to nature, just as Milesian rationalism demythologized other natural phenomena such as earthquakes. The systematic study of anatomy, physiology, and illnesses led to the discovery of cause-effect relations and a more sophisticated terminology and understanding of the diseases that ultimately yielded rational science.

=== Cosmology ===
The pre-Socratics were the first to attempt to provide reductive explanations for a plethora of natural phenomena.

Firstly, they were preoccupied with the mystery of the cosmic matter—what was the basic substance of the universe? Anaximander suggested apeiron (limitless), which hints, as Aristotle analyzed, there is no beginning and no end to it, both chronologically and within the space. Anaximenes placed aêr (air) as the primary principle, probably after realizing the importance of air to life and/or the need to explain various observable changes. Heraclitus, also seeking to address the issue of the ever changing world, placed fire as the primary principle of the universe, that transforms to water and earth to produce the universe. Ever-transforming nature is summarized by Heraclitus' axiom panta rhei (everything is in a state of flux). Parmenides suggested two ever-lasting primary building blocs, night and day, which together form the universe. Empedocles increased the building blocks to four and named them roots, while also adding Love and Strife, to serve as the driving force for the roots to mingle. Anaxagoras extended even more the plurality of Empedocles, claiming everything is in everything, myriads of substances were mixing among each other except one, Nous (mind) that orchestrates everything—but did not attribute divine characteristics to Nous. Leucippus and Democritus asserted the universe consists of atoms and void, while the motion of atoms is responsible for the changes we observe.

=== Rationalism, observation and the beginning of scientific thought ===
The pre-Socratic intellectual revolution is widely considered to have been the first step towards liberation of the human mind from the mythical world and initiated a march towards reason and scientific thought that yielded modern western philosophy and science. The pre-Socratics sought to understand the various aspects of nature by means of rationalism, observations, and offering explanations that could be deemed as scientific, giving birth to what became Western rationalism. Thales was the first to seek for a unitary arche of the world. Whether arche meant the beginning, the origin, the main principle or the basic element is unclear, but was the first attempt to reduce the explanations of the universe to a single cause, based on reason and not guided by any sort of divinity. Anaximander offered the principle of sufficient reason, a revolutionary argument that would also yield the principle that nothing comes out of nothing. Most of pre-Socratics seemed indifferent to the concept of teleology, especially the Atomists who fiercely rejected the idea. According to them, the various phenomena were the consequence of the motion of atoms without any purpose. Xenophanes also advanced a critique of anthropomorphic religion by highlighting in a rational way the inconsistency of depictions of the gods in Greek popular religion.

Undoubtedly, pre-Socratics paved the way towards science, but whether what they did could constitute science is a matter of debate. Thales had offered the first account of a reduction and a generalization, a significant milestone towards scientific thought. Other pre-Socratics also sought to answer the question of arche, offering various answers, but the first step towards scientific thought was already taken. Philosopher Karl Popper, in his seminal work Back to Presocratics (1958) traces the roots of modern science (and the West) to the early Greek philosophers. He writes: "There can be little doubt that the Greek tradition of philosophical criticism had its main source in Ionia ... It thus leads the tradition which created the rational or scientific attitude, and with it our Western civilization, the only civilization, which is based upon science (though, of course, not upon science alone)." Elsewhere in the same study Popper diminishes the significance of the label they should carry as purely semantics. "There is the most perfect possible continuity of thought between [the Presocratics'] theories and the later developments in physics. Whether they are called philosophers, or pre-scientists, or scientists, matters very little." Other scholars did not share the same view. F. M. Cornford considered the Ionanians as dogmatic speculators, due to their lack of empiricism.

== Reception and legacy ==
=== Antiquity ===
The pre-Socratics had a direct influence on classical antiquity in many ways. The philosophic thought produced by the pre-Socratics heavily influenced later philosophers, historians and playwrights. One line of influence was the Socrato-Ciceronian tradition, while the other was the Platonic-Aristotelian.

Socrates, Xenophon and Cicero were highly influenced by the physiologoi (naturalists) as they were named in ancient times. The naturalists impressed young Socrates and he was interested in the quest for the substance of the cosmos, but his interest waned as he became steadily more focused on epistemology, virtue, and ethics rather than the natural world. According to Xenophon, the reason was that Socrates believed humans incapable of comprehending the cosmos. Plato, in the Phaedo, claims that Socrates was uneasy with the materialistic approach of the pre-Socratics, particularly Anaxagoras. Cicero analyzed his views on the pre-Socratics in his Tusculanae Disputationes, as he distinguished the theoretical nature of pre-Socratic thought from previous "sages" who were interested in more practical issues. Xenophon, like Cicero, saw the difference between pre-Socratics and Socrates being his interest in human affairs (ta anthropina).

The pre-Socratics deeply influenced both Plato and Aristotle. Aristotle discussed the pre-Socratics in the first book of Metaphysics, as an introduction to his own philosophy and the quest for arche. He was the first to state that philosophy starts with Thales. It is not clear whether Thales talked of water as arche, or that was a retrospective interpretation by Aristotle, who was examining his predecessors under the scope of his views. More crucially, Aristotle criticized the pre-Socratics for not identifying a purpose as a final cause, a fundamental idea in Aristotelian metaphysics. Plato also attacked pre-Socratic materialism.

Later, during the Hellenistic era, philosophers of various currents focused on the study of nature and advanced pre-Socratic ideas. The Stoics incorporated features from Anaxagoras and Heraclitus, such as nous and fire respectively. The Epicureans saw Democritus' atomism as their predecessor while the Sceptics were linked to Xenophanes.

=== Modern era ===
The pre-Socratics, along with the rest of ancient Greece, invented the central concepts of Western civilization: freedom, democracy, individual autonomy and rationalism. Francis Bacon, a 16th-century philosopher known for advancing the scientific method, was probably the first philosopher of the modern era to use pre-Socratic axioms extensively in his texts. He criticized the pre-Socratic theory of knowledge by Xenophanes and others, claiming that their deductive reasoning could not yield meaningful results—an opinion contemporary philosophy of science rejects. Bacon's fondness for the pre-Socratics, especially Democritus' atomist theory, might have been because of his anti-Aristotelianism.

Friedrich Nietzsche admired the pre-Socratics deeply, calling them "tyrants of the spirit" to mark their antithesis and his preference against Socrates and his successors. Nietzsche also weaponized pre-Socratic antiteleology, coupled with the materialism exemplified by Democritus, for his attack on Christianity and its morals. Nietzsche saw the pre-Socratics as the first ancestors of contemporary science—linking Empedocles to Darwinism and Heraclitus to physicist Helmholtz. According to his narrative, limned in many of his books, the pre-Socratic era was the glorious era of Greece, while the so-called Golden Age that followed was an age of decay. Nietzsche incorporated the pre-Socratics in his Apollonian and Dionysian dialectics, with them representing the creative Dionysian aspect of the duo.

Martin Heidegger found the roots of his phenomenology and later thinking of Things and the Fourfold in the pre-Socratics, considering Anaximander, Parmenides, and Heraclitus as the original thinkers on being, which he identified in their work as physis [φύσις] (emergence, contrasted against κρύπτεσθαι, kryptesthai, in Heraclitus' Fragment 123) or aletheia [ἀλήθεια] (truth as unconcealment).

== See also ==
- Italian school
- List of pre-Socratic philosophers

== Cited sources ==
- Barnes, Jonathan (1987). Early Greek Philosophy. Penguin Books. ISBN 978-0-14-044461-2.
- Burkert, Walter (27 October 2008). "Prehistory of Presocratic Philosophy in an Orientalizing Context". In Curd, Patricia (ed.). The Oxford Handbook of Presocratic Philosophy. Daniel W Graham. Oxford University Press, USA. pp. 55–88. ISBN 978-0-19-514687-5.
- Curd, Patricia (27 October 2008). "Anaxagoras and the Theory of Everything". In Curd, Patricia (ed.). The Oxford Handbook of Presocratic Philosophy. Daniel W Graham. Oxford University Press, USA. ISBN 978-0-19-514687-5.
- Curd, Patricia (2020). "Presocratic Philosophy". In Edward N. Zalta (ed.). Stanford Encyclopedia of Philosophy. Metaphysics Research Lab, Stanford University.
- Evans, C. Stephen (2019). A History of Western Philosophy: From the Pre-Socratics to Postmodernism. InterVarsity Press. ISBN 978-0-8308-7369-2.
- Frede, Michael (27 October 2008). "Aristotle's Account of the Origins of Philosophy". In Curd, Patricia (ed.). The Oxford Handbook of Presocratic Philosophy. Daniel W Graham. Oxford University Press, USA. pp. 501–529. ISBN 978-0-19-514687-5.
- Graham, Daniel W. (27 October 2008). "Heraclitus: Flux, Order, and Knowledge". In Curd, Patricia (ed.). The Oxford Handbook of Presocratic Philosophy. Daniel W Graham. Oxford University Press, USA. pp. 169–187. ISBN 978-0-19-514687-5.
- Graham, Jacob N (2021). Pre-Socratic philosophy. Internet Encyclopedia of Philosophy.
- Gagarin, Michael; Woodruff, Paul (27 October 2008). "The Sophists". In Curd, Patricia (ed.). The Oxford Handbook of Presocratic Philosophy. Daniel W Graham. Oxford University Press, USA. ISBN 978-0-19-514687-5.
- Hankinson, R.J. (27 October 2008). "Reason, Cause, and Explanation in Presocratic Philosophy". In Curd, Patricia (ed.). The Oxford Handbook of Presocratic Philosophy. Daniel W Graham. Oxford University Press, USA. pp. 434–457. ISBN 978-0-19-514687-5.
- Huffman, Carl (27 October 2008). "Two Problems in Pythagoreanism". In Curd, Patricia (ed.). The Oxford Handbook of Presocratic Philosophy. Daniel W Graham. Oxford University Press, USA. pp. 284–304. ISBN 978-0-19-514687-5.
- Kirk, Geoffrey; Raven, J. E. (1977). The Presocratic Philosophers: A Critical History with a Selection of Texts. Cambridge University Press. ISBN 978-0-521-27455-5.
- Lesher, J.H. (27 October 2008). "The humanizing of knowledge in presocratic thought". In Curd, Patricia (ed.). The Oxford Handbook of Presocratic Philosophy. Daniel W Graham. Oxford University Press, USA. pp. 458–484. ISBN 978-0-19-514687-5.
- Mourelatos, Alexander P. D. (27 October 2008). "The Cloud-Astrophysics of Xenophanes and Ionian Material Monism". In Curd, Patricia (ed.). The Oxford Handbook of Presocratic Philosophy. Daniel W Graham. Oxford University Press, USA. pp. 134–168. ISBN 978-0-19-514687-5.
- Irwin, Terence (1999). Classical Philosophy. Oxford University Press. ISBN 978-0-19-289253-9.
- Laks, André; Most, Glenn (1 January 2018). The Concept of Presocratic Philosophy: Its Origin, Development, and Significance. Princeton University Press. ISBN 978-1-4008-8791-0.
- Longrigg, James (1989). "Presocratic Philosophy and Hippocratic Medicine". History of Science. 27 (1). SAGE Publications: 1–39. Bibcode:1989HisSc..27....1L. doi:10.1177/007327538902700101. ISSN 0073-2753. PMID 11621888. S2CID 742356.
- Longrigg, James (7 March 2013). Greek Rational Medicine: Philosophy and Medicine from Alcmaeon to the Alexandrians. Routledge. ISBN 978-1-134-97366-8.
- McCarthy, John C. (1999). "Bacon's Third Sailing: The 'Pre–Socratic' Origins of Modern Philosophy". In McCoy, Joe (ed.). Early Greek Philosophy:Reason at the Beginning of Philosophy. Washington, D.C.: The Catholic University of America Press. pp. 157–188. ISBN 978-0-19-964465-0.
- Most, Glenn W. (28 June 1999). "16 - The poetics of early Greek philosophy". In A. A. Long (ed.). The Cambridge Companion to Early Greek Philosophy. Cambridge University Press. ISBN 978-0-521-44667-9.
- Osborne, Catherine (22 April 2004). Presocratic Philosophy: A Very Short Introduction. OUP Oxford. ISBN 978-0-19-284094-3.
- Palmer, John (27 October 2008). "Classical Representations and Uses of the Presocratics". In Curd, Patricia (ed.). The Oxford Handbook of Presocratic Philosophy. Daniel W Graham. Oxford University Press, USA. pp. 530–554. ISBN 978-0-19-514687-5.
- Primavesi, Oliver (27 October 2008). "Empedocles: Physical and Mythical Divinity". In Curd, Patricia (ed.). The Oxford Handbook of Presocratic Philosophy. Daniel W Graham. Oxford University Press, USA. ISBN 978-0-19-514687-5.
- Robinson, T.M. (27 October 2008). "Presocratic Theology". In Curd, Patricia (ed.). The Oxford Handbook of Presocratic Philosophy. Daniel W Graham. Oxford University Press, USA. pp. 485–499. ISBN 978-0-19-514687-5.
- Runia, David T. (27 October 2008). "The sources of pre-Socratic philosophy". In Curd, Patricia (ed.). The Oxford Handbook of Presocratic Philosophy. Daniel W Graham. Oxford University Press, USA. pp. 27–54. ISBN 978-0-19-514687-5.
- Sandywell, Barry (1996). Presocratic Reflexivity: The Construction of Philosophical Discourse c. 600-450 B.C.: Logological Investigations: Volume Three. Routledge. ISBN 978-1-134-85347-2.
- Sedley, David (November 2013). "The Pre-Socratics to the Hellenistic Age". In Bullivant, Stephen (ed.). The Oxford Handbook of Atheism. Michael Ruse. OUP Oxford. doi:10.1093/oxfordhb/9780199644650.013.002. ISBN 978-0-19-964465-0.
- Taub, Liba (30 January 2020). The Cambridge Companion to Ancient Greek and Roman Science. Cambridge University Press. ISBN 978-1-107-09248-8.
- Vamvacas, Constantine J. (28 May 2009). The Founders of Western Thought – The Presocratics: A diachronic parallelism between Presocratic Thought and Philosophy and the Natural Sciences. Springer Science & Business Media. pp. 20–. ISBN 978-1-4020-9791-1.
- Van der Eijk, Philip (27 October 2008). "The Role of Medicine in the Formation of Early Greek Thought". In Curd, Patricia (ed.). The Oxford Handbook of Presocratic Philosophy. Daniel W Graham. Oxford University Press, USA. pp. 385–412. ISBN 978-0-19-514687-5.
- Warren, James (5 December 2014). Presocratics. Routledge. ISBN 978-1-317-49337-2.
- Waterfield, Robin (7 September 2000). The First Philosophers: The Presocratics and Sophists. Oxford University Press, UK. ISBN 978-0-19-282454-7.
- Wright, M.R. (27 October 2008). "Presocratic cosmologies". In Curd, Patricia (ed.). The Oxford Handbook of Presocratic Philosophy. Daniel W Graham. Oxford University Press, USA. pp. 413–432. ISBN 978-0-19-514687-5.
