= Lycophron (sophist) =

5th-century BC Greek sophist

Lycophron (/ˈlaɪkəfrɒn/ LY-kə-fron; Ancient Greek: Λυκόφρων, romanized: Lukóphrōn) was a sophist of Ancient Greece.

The central point about Lycrophron as attacked in the Politics of Aristotle, is that Lycrophron rejected the idea that the state exists to make people "just and good", instead holding the view that justice and law is about preventing people violating the bodies and goods of each other. This is the only reference to Lycrophron in the Politics.

The details of his life remain obscure, other than a number of references in the works of Aristotle. Lycophron was probably among the students of Gorgias, and is mentioned as a sophist by Aristotle. He rejected the supposed value of an aristocratic birth, claiming that

Now the nobility of good birth is obscure, and its grandeur a matter of words.

meaning that there is no factual difference between those well-born and those low-born; only words and opinion assign value to these different circumstances of birth. This statement may indicate that Lycophron shared the beliefs of Antiphon, that (regardless of their ancestry) both Greeks and barbarians are born with the same capacities: An egalitarian belief that was a minority view in the 5th century BC. He is also known for his statement (reproduced by Aristotle, in the latter's Politics, 1280b10), that "law is only a convention, a surety to another of justice". Also translated as "a guarantor of men's rights against one another". He, thus, believed that law is a matter of agreement, a social convention and not a natural or universal standard (there is no evidence that Lycophron rejected the idea that law is a universal standard – indeed his view appears far more universalist than that of Aristotle, in that Lycophron proposes a single standard, what would now be called the non-aggression principle, in relation to all states). In this respect his views on law are similar to those of Protagoras. This means that he treats law as a mere means, in the context of a (perhaps primitive) social contract theory, without considering it as something special, in contradistinction to, e.g., Plato but similar to both Thrasymachus and Callicles, albeit that their theories have – as far as can be ascertained from the information available about them – more specific characteristics.

While Lycophron is considered one of the first proponents of a social contract theory, this is mostly a conjecture based on his theory of law. His few surviving quotes do not include a theory on the emergence of society from agreements. Such ideas did exist, however, in the works of his contemporary Protagoras. These 5th-century BC ideas viewed society and morality as human creations, both aiming to protect the lives and safety of the community members. The laws were subject to change, reflecting the changing views of a society. There was no "unchanging standard of righteousness". In other words, Protagoras and like-minded thinkers were precursors of Utilitarianism.

In Metaphysics, Lycophron is quoted as claiming that "knowledge is a communion of knowledge and of soul". And also that the communion is the cause of the unity of knowledge and the soul. In Physics, it is mentioned that when Lycophron discussed "whether the part and the whole are one or more than one" he avoided using the singular form of the verb "to be". In Rhetoric, Aristotle examines several peculiar expressions used by Lycophron, such as "the many-visaged sky of the mighty-peaked earth", "the narrow-passaged promontory", calling Xerxes "a monster of a man" and Sciron "a human destroyer". The same work includes another reference to a Lycophron, though it fits poorly with what is known of the sophist. Aristotle reports that an opponent of Lycophron and Peitholaus stated in a law-court that "These men used to sell you when they are at home, and now they have come here and bought you." There is no context given to this phrase, though modern scholars suspect this is a reference to a case involving Lycophron I of Pherae, a tyrant.

In Sophistical Refutations, Aristotle mentions Lycophron as an example of changing the subject of a conversation when one has nothing to state on the original subject. He reports that once Lycophron was compelled by certain persons to speak in praise of the lyre. He reportedly found himself at a loss for words on this subject. So he offered a few words on the musical organ and then switched the topic to Lyra, the constellation named after it. Being more knowledgeable in this topic, he had much more to say.

== Sources ==
- Diels, Hermann; Kent Sprague, Rosamond (2001), The Older Sophists: A Complete Translation by Several Hands of the Fragments in Die Fragmente Der Vorsokratiker, Edited by Diels-Kranz. With a New Edition of Antiphon and of Euthydemus, Hackett Publishing, ISBN 978-0872205567
- Menake, George T. (2004), Three Traditions of Greek Political Thought: Plato in Dialogue, University Press of America, ISBN 978-0761829614
- Richard G. Mulgan, 'Lycophron and Greek Theories of Social Contract'. Journal of the History of Ideas 40 (1), 1979: 121 – 128.
