= Hippo (philosopher) =

Pre-Socratic Greek philosopher

Hippo (/ˈhɪpoʊ/; Ancient Greek: Ἵππων, Hippon; fl. 5th century BC) was a pre-Socratic Greek philosopher. He is variously described as coming from Rhegium, Metapontum, Samos, and Croton, and it is possible that there was more than one philosopher with this name.

Although he was a natural philosopher, Aristotle refused to place him among the other great pre-Socratic philosophers "because of the paltriness of his thought".

== Beliefs ==
At some point Hippo was accused of atheism, but since his works have perished, we cannot be certain why. He was accused of impiety by the comic poet Cratinus in his Panoptae, and, according to Clement of Alexandria, Hippo supposedly ordered the following couplet to be inscribed on his tomb:

Behold the tomb of Hippo, whom in death
Fate made an equal of the immortal gods.

The classical philologist Michael Hendry has suggested an alternative translation of the epitaph that underscores the argument for Hippo's atheism:

This is the tomb of Hippo,
Whom Fate made just as dead as the immortal gods.

According to Hippolytus, Hippo held water and fire to be the primary elements, with fire originating from water, and then developing itself by generating the universe. Simplicius, too, says that Hippo thought that water was the principle of all things. Most of the accounts of his philosophy suggest that he was interested in biological matters. He thought that there is an appropriate level of moisture in all living things, and disease is caused when the moisture is out of balance. He also viewed the soul as arising from both mind and water. A medieval scholium on Aristophanes' The Clouds attributes to Hippo the view that the heavens were like the dome (πνιγεύς) of an oven covering the Earth.
