= Athamas of Posidonia =

Pythagorean philosopher

Athamas (Ancient Greek: Ἀθάμας, fl. 5th century BCE) of Posidonia was a Pythagorean philosopher, cited by the theologian and philosopher Clement of Alexandria as believing that everything in the universe was composed of four elements: earth, wind, fire, and water.

He is briefly mentioned by the Neoplatonist philosopher Iamblichus, in a list of Pythagoreans, but there are no further mentions of him, and nothing further is known about him.
