= Polus =

5th-century BC Greek rhetorician

Polus (Greek: Πῶλος, "colt"; fl. c. 5th century BCE) was an ancient Greek philosophical figure best remembered for his depiction in the writing of Plato. He was a pupil of the famous orator Gorgias, and teacher of oratory from the city of Acragas, Sicily.

== Views ==
Almost everything that is known about Polus comes from the Socratic dialogues of Plato. He features heavily in the Gorgias, a dialogue on the nature of rhetoric. Polus also appears in the Phaedrus and the Theages. Outside of Plato's work, he is also mentioned in Book 1 of Aristotle's Metaphysics.

Much of what is known about Polus comes from Plato's Gorgias. What we get from this text is a look into Polus' beliefs about rhetoric. Polus advertises rhetoric as the quick route to the life of a tyrant who can run over others and escape punishment for his crimes. Polus saw rhetoric as the highest of all human arts and thinks that rhetoric is the only knowledge one needs to live well. Polus also saw rhetorical knowledge as a matter of experience rather than an art. Polus believed that experience makes our life to proceed in accordance with art whereas inexperience causes it to proceed in accordance with chance. Digging deeper into the Gorgias shows that Polus and Socrates often clash, and that Socrates purposely criticized rhetoric in order to trigger Polus' shameless defense of rhetoric. Polus is also seen as calling attention to rhetoric for its capacity for injustice. Polus had many philosophical views that did not directly agree with Socrates' views. Polus sees rhetorical knowledge as something that comes from experience and sees rhetoric as something that is used for evil and serves a tyrannical desire in one's life.

== See also ==
- List of speakers in Plato's dialogues
