= Diels–Kranz numbering =

Standard numbering system for Pre-Socratic philosophers' works

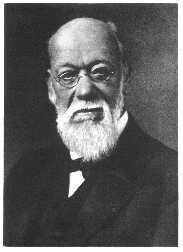
Hermann Alexander Diels

Diels–Kranz (DK) numbering is the standard system for referencing the works of the ancient Greek pre-Socratic philosophers, based on the collection of quotations from and reports of their work, Die Fragmente der Vorsokratiker (The Fragments of the Pre-Socratics), by Hermann Alexander Diels. The Fragmente was first published in 1903, was later revised and expanded three times by Diels, and was finally revised in a fifth edition (1934–7) by Walther Kranz and again in a sixth edition (1952). In Diels–Kranz, each passage, or item, is assigned a number which is used to uniquely identify the ancient personality with which it is concerned, and the type of item given. Diels–Kranz is used in academia to cite pre-Socratic philosophers, and the system also encompasses Sophists and pre-Homeric poets such as Orpheus.

Stephanus pagination is the comparable system for referring to Plato, and Bekker numbering is the comparable system for referring to Aristotle.

== Background ==
The works of the pre-Socratics have not survived extant to the present day. Our knowledge of them exists only through references in the works of later philosophers (known as doxography) in the form of quotations and paraphrases. For example, our knowledge of Thales of Miletus comes largely from the works of Aristotle, who lived centuries after him. Another interesting example of such a source is Hippolytus of Rome, whose polemic Refutation of All Heresies is a source of many direct quotations of Heraclitus as well as of other philosophers, thereby perpetuating the work of those he was refuting.

These quotations, paraphrases, and other references to pre-Socratic philosophers were collected by Diels and Kranz in their book, which became a standard text in modern pre-Socratic education and scholarship. Because of its influence, Diels–Kranz numbering became the standard way of referencing the material: in literature, conferences, and even in conversation.

== Numbering system ==
The number corresponding to an item was made up of three parts:

1. a number representing the personality the item is concerned with - this number is also the chapter number in the Fragmente. For example, "11", also the eleventh chapter of the Fragmente, refers to Thales.
2. the letter A, B, or C, corresponding to the type of item given, respectively:
  A: Testimonia: These are accounts of the authors' life and doctrines. Testimonia include commentaries on the works of the pre-Socratics and accounts of their lives and of their philosophical views.
  B: Ipsissima Verba: Literally translated to "exact words", and sometimes also termed "fragments", these are items containing exact words of the author in the form of quotations in later works.
  C: Imitations: Works which take the author as a model.
3. a number representing the position of the particular item in its chapter. For example:

Why, take the case of Thales, Theodorus. While he was studying the stars and looking upwards, he fell into a pit, and a neat, witty Thracian servant girl jeered at him, they say, because he was so eager to know the things in the sky that he could not see what was there before him at his very feet.

The above text has a DK number of 11A9, since it refers to Thales who is, as mentioned above, chapter 11's subject. The source is Theaetetus (one of Plato's dialogues), and gives an account of Thales' life, hence it is a testimonium, represented by the letter A. Finally, it is the ninth item in its chapter, giving it the overall number of DK 11A9.

Sometimes, the chapter (personality) number may simply be replaced by the name, which can be helpful in cases where the former is the same as the passage number, to avoid ambiguity. For example:

Those who seek for gold dig up much earth and find a little.

Rather than "22B22" the above may also instead be referred to as "Heraclitus B22" as it is a direct transmission of the words of Heraclitus (thus, B) and is the 22nd item in the chapter about Heraclitus (whose chapter number is 22) in the Fragmente.

A similar way of referring to quotes is the system prefixed with "LM" by André Laks and Glenn W. Most, published in 2016.

== Table ==
The following table gives the Diels–Kranz numbering of Pre-Socratic philosophers. (Note: Kathleen Freeman adopted the fifth edition's numberings for both her Companion and Ancilla, while also reproducing the fourth edition's numberings in parentheses. A matching online version of the Ancilla's table of contents is available at Sacred Texts, for reference. Later, Robin Waterfield prepared a new Pre-Socratic reader, which uses an entirely different scheme unrelated to Diels–Kranz. Nevertheless, Waterfield gives a partial concordance of his own scheme with that of Diels–Kranz, and the partial DK numbering given by Waterfield matches the fifth-edition Fragmente numbering used by Freeman, so far as it is taken in Waterfield's case.) Note that the numbering scheme presented is that of the fifth edition of Die Fragmente der Vorsokratiker, the first to be revised by Kranz. The fifth edition's numbering is the scheme which has since gained the most traction in modern Pre-Socratic scholarship, and it is the one used consistently throughout this article. It should not be confused with the numberings given in other versions, which changed frequently depending on the particular edition of the Fragmente. (Note: For one example of a variant edition and numbering scheme, see ix-x in the following link.)

Most entries (78) are concerned with a single, named individual, while the remaining minority of entries (12) have more complex context. Of these latter, eight (10, 19, 39, 46, 53-56) are each concerned with groups of named personalities, who typically have a clear relationship of some kind to justify their association in each entry. Two entries (58, 79) are devoted not to individuals, but to schools of thought (Pythagoreanism and Sophism), and the last two (89, 90) reproduce contemporaneous anonymous texts. Although "the Seven Sages of Greece" implies a clearly defined set of seven people, historical disagreement renders intractable the problem of exactly who they were, with multiple sources suggesting several different candidates. If one takes the Seven Sages as a group of seven and includes the later Iamblichus, Diels–Kranz encompasses 106 named personalities and two anonymous authors. The chapter on Sophism is concerned with the named sophists who take up most of the rest of the scheme, and per Freeman with regard to the chapter on Pythagoreanism, a catalogue due to Iamblichus lists 218 named men and 17 named women as Pythagoreans, along with other probable, anonymous adherents.

In several cases, the personalities listed are so obscure that they are merely mentioned by name in other sources, commonly with hints as to their geographical and philosophical associations, and without even surviving paraphrases of any of their ideas, or what they might have written. That is, these more obscure personalities survive in the historical record only as names cited by others, and so came to be included in Diels–Kranz for the sake of scholarly completeness.

1	Orpheus	31	Empedocles	61	Metrodorus
2	Musaeus	32	Menestor	62	Cleidemus
3	Epimenides	33	Xuthus	63	Idaeus
4	Hesiod	34	Boidas	64	Diogenes
5	Phocus	35	Thrasyalces	65	Cratylus
6	Cleostratus	36	Ion	66	Antisthenes
7	Pherecydes	37	Damon	67	Leucippus
8	Theagenes	38	Hippon	68	Democritus
9	Acusilaus	39	Phaleas and Hippodamus	69	Nessas
10	The Seven Sages of Greece: Bias, Chilon, Cleobulus, Periander, Pittacus, Solon, and Thales	40	Polycleitus	70	Metrodorus
11	Thales	41	Oenopides	71	Diogenes
12	Anaximander	42	Hippocrates	72	Anaxarchus
13	Anaximenes	43	Theodorus	73	Hecataeus
14	Pythagoras	44	Philolaus	74	Apollodorus
15	Cercops	45	Eurytus	75	Nausiphanes
16	Petron	46	Archippus, Lysis, and Opsimus	76	Diotimus
17	Brontinus	47	Archytas	77	Bion
18	Hippasos	48	Ocellus	78	Bolus
19	Calliphon and Democedes	49	Timaeus	79	'Sophist': Name and Concept
20	Parmeniscus	50	Hicetas	80	Protagoras
21	Xenophanes	51	Ecphantus	81	Xeniades
22	Heraclitus	52	Xenophilus	82	Gorgias
23	Epicharmus	53	Diocles, Echecrates, Polymnastus, Phanton, and Arion	83	Licophron
24	Alcmaeon	54	Prorus, Amyclas, and Cleinias	84	Prodicus
25	Iccus	55	Damon and Phintias	85	Thrasymachus
26	Paron	56	Simus, Myonides, and Euphranor	86	Hippias
27	Ameinias	57	Lycon	87	Antiphon
28	Parmenides	58	The Pythagorean School	88	Critias
29	Zeno	59	Anaxagoras	89	The Anonymous Writer quoted by Iamblichus
30	Melissus	60	Archelaus	90	Twofold Arguments

== See also ==
- Stephanus pagination
- Bekker numbering
