= Timeline of cosmological theories =

This timeline of cosmological theories and discoveries is a chronological record of the development of humanity's understanding of the cosmos over the last two-plus millennia. Modern cosmological ideas follow the development of the scientific discipline of physical cosmology.

For millennia, what today is known to be the Solar System was regarded as the contents of the "whole universe", so advances in the knowledge of both mostly paralleled. Clear distinction was not made until circa mid-17th century. See Timeline of Solar System astronomy for further details on this side.

== Antiquity ==
- c. 16th century BCE – Mesopotamian cosmology has a flat, circular Earth enclosed in a cosmic ocean.
- c. 15th–11th century BCE – The Rigveda, a sacred text of Hinduism, contains several hymns concerning the origins of the cosmos. The Nasadiya Sukta (10.129) questions how creation arose and whether its origin can be known.

Early Hebrew conception of the cosmos. The firmament, Sheol and tehom are depicted.

- c. 15th–6th century BCE – During this period, Zoroastrian Cosmology Develops and defines Creation as a manifestation of a cosmic conflict between existence and non-existence, good and evil, and light and darkness.
- 6th century BCE – The Babylonian Map of the World shows the Earth surrounded by the cosmic ocean, with seven islands arranged around it so as to form a seven-pointed star. Contemporary Biblical cosmology reflects the same view of a flat, circular Earth swimming on water and overarched by the solid vault of the firmament to which are fastened the stars.
- 6th–4th century BCE – Greek philosophers, as early as Anaximander, introduce the idea of multiple or even infinite universes. Democritus further detailed that these worlds varied in distance, size; the presence, number and size of their suns and moons; and that they are subject to destructive collisions. Also during this time period, the Greeks established that the Earth is spherical rather than flat.
- 6th century BCE – Anaximander conceives a mechanical, non-mythological model of the world: the Earth floats very still in the centre of the infinite, not supported by anything. Its curious shape is that of a cylinder with a height one-third of its diameter. The flat top forms the inhabited world, which is surrounded by a circular oceanic mass. Anaximander considered the Sun as a huge object (larger than the land of Peloponnesus), and consequently, he realized how far from Earth it might be. In his system the celestial bodies turned at different distances. At the origin, after the separation of hot and cold, a ball of flame appeared that surrounded Earth like bark on a tree. This ball broke apart to form the rest of the Universe. It resembled a system of hollow concentric wheels, filled with fire, with the rims pierced by holes like those of a flute. Consequently, the Sun was the fire that one could see through a hole the same size as the Earth on the farthest wheel, and an eclipse corresponded with the occlusion of that hole. The diameter of the solar wheel was twenty-seven times that of the Earth (or twenty-eight, depending on the sources) and the lunar wheel, whose fire was less intense, eighteen (or nineteen) times. Its hole could change shape, thus explaining lunar phases. The stars and the planets, located closer, followed the same model.
- 5th century BCE – Parmenides is credited to be the first Greek who declared that the Earth is spherical and is situated in the centre of the universe.
- 5th century BCE – Pythagoreans such as Philolaus believed the motion of planets is caused by an out-of-sight "fire" at the centre of the universe (not the Sun) that powers them, and Sun and Earth orbit that Central Fire at different distances. The Earth's inhabited side is always opposite to the Central Fire, rendering it invisible to people. They also claimed that the Moon and the planets orbit the Earth. This model depicts a moving Earth, simultaneously self-rotating and orbiting around an external point (but not around the Sun), thus not being geocentrical, contrary to common intuition. Due to philosophical concerns about the number 10 (a "perfect number" for the Pythagorians), they also added a tenth "hidden body" or Counter-Earth (Antichthon), always in the opposite side of the invisible Central Fire and therefore also invisible from Earth.
- 4th century BCE – Plato claimed in his Timaeus that circles and spheres are the preferred shape of the universe, that the Earth is at the center and is circled by, ordered in-to-outwards: Moon, Sun, Venus, Mercury, Mars, Jupiter, Saturn, and finally the fixed stars located on the celestial sphere. In Plato's complex cosmogony, the demiurge gave the primacy to the motion of Sameness and left it undivided; but he divided the motion of Difference in six parts, to have seven unequal circles. He prescribed these circles to move in opposite directions, three of them with equal speeds, the others with unequal speeds, but always in proportion. These circles are the orbits of the heavenly bodies: the three moving at equal speeds are the Sun, Venus and Mercury, while the four moving at unequal speeds are the Moon, Mars, Jupiter and Saturn. The complicated pattern of these movements is bound to be repeated again after a period called a 'complete' or 'perfect' year. However, others like Philolaus and Hicetas had rejected geocentrism.
- 4th century BCE – Eudoxus of Cnidus devised a geometric-mathematical model for the movements of the planets, the first known effort in this sense, based on (conceptual) concentric spheres centered on Earth. To explain the complexity of the movements of the planets along with that of the Sun and the Moon, Eudoxus thought they move as if they were attached to a number of concentrical, invisible spheres, every one of them rotating around its own and different axis and at different paces. His model had twenty-seven homocentric spheres with each sphere explaining a type of observable motion for each celestial object. Eudoxus emphasised that this is a purely mathematical construct of the model in the sense that the spheres of each celestial body do not exist, it just shows the possible positions of the bodies. His model was later refined and expanded by Callippus.

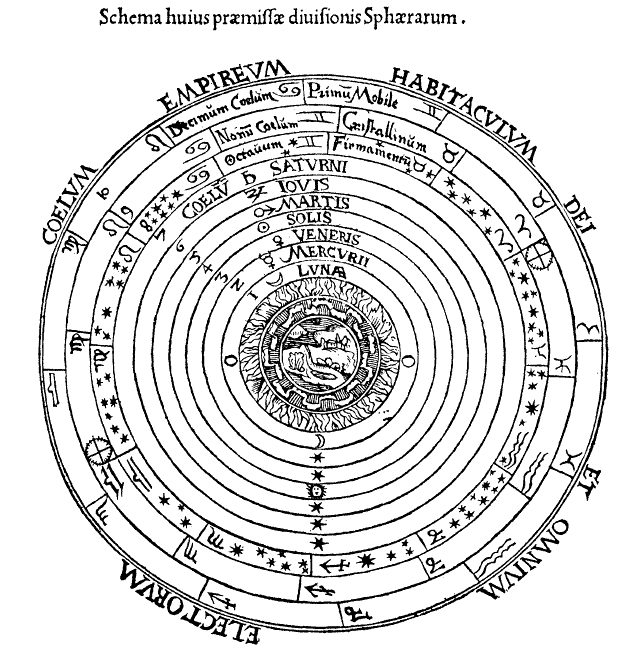
Geocentric celestial spheres; Peter Apian's Cosmographia (Antwerp, 1539)

- 4th century BCE – Aristotle follows the Plato's Earth-centered universe in which the Earth is stationary and the cosmos (or universe) is finite in extent but infinite in time. He argued for a spherical Earth using lunar eclipses and other observations. Aristotle adopted and expanded even more the previous Eudoxus' and Callippus' model, but by supposing the spheres were material and crystalline. Aristotle also tried to determine whether the Earth moves and concluded that all the celestial bodies fall towards Earth by natural tendency and since Earth is the centre of that tendency, it is stationary. Plato seems to have obscurely argued that the universe did have a beginning, but Aristotle and others interpreted his words differently.
- 4th century BCE – De Mundo – Five elements, situated in spheres in five regions, the less being in each case surrounded by the greater – namely, earth surrounded by water, water by air, air by fire, and fire by aether – make up the whole Universe.
- 4th century BCE – Heraclides Ponticus is said to be the first Greek who proposes that the Earth rotates on its axis, from west to east, once every 24 hours, contradicting Aristotle's teachings. Simplicius says that Heraclides proposed that the irregular movements of the planets can be explained if the Earth moves while the Sun stays still, but these statements are disputed.
- 3rd century BCE – Aristarchus of Samos proposes a Sun-centered universe and Earth's rotation in its own axis. He also provides evidences for his theory from his own observations.
- 3rd century BCE – Archimedes in his essay The Sand Reckoner, estimates the diameter of the cosmos to be the equivalent in stadia of what would in modern times be called two light years, if Aristarchus' theories were correct.
- 2nd century BCE – Seleucus of Seleucia advocates Aristarchus' heliocentric universe, presenting it as a fact (whereas Aristarchus presented it as a hypothesis). According to Strabo (1.1.9), Seleucus was the first to state that the tides are due to the attraction of the Moon, and that the height of the tides depends on the Moon's position relative to the Sun.
- 2nd century BCE – Apollonius of Perga shows the equivalence of two descriptions of the apparent retrograde planet motions (assuming the geocentric model), one using eccentrics and another deferent and epicycles. The latter will be a key feature for future models. The epicycle is described as a small orbit within a greater one, called the deferent: as a planet orbits the Earth, it also orbits the original orbit, so its trajectory resembles a curve known as an epitrochoid. This could explain how the planet seems to move as viewed from Earth.
- 2nd century BCE – Eratosthenes determines that the radius of the Earth is roughly 6,400 km.
- 2nd century BCE – Hipparchus uses parallax to determine that the distance to the Moon is roughly 380,000 km. The work of Hipparchus about the Earth-Moon system was so accurate that he could forecast solar and lunar eclipses for the next six centuries. Also, he discovers the precession of the equinoxes, and compiles a star catalog of about 850 entries.
- c. 2nd century BCE–3rd century CE – In Hindu cosmology, the Manusmriti (1.67–80) and Puranas describe time as cyclical, with a new universe (planets and life) created by Brahma every 8.64 billion years. The universe is created, maintained, and destroyed within a kalpa (day of Brahma) period lasting for 4.32 billion years, and is followed by a pralaya (night) period of partial dissolution equal in duration. In some Puranas (e.g. Bhagavata Purana), a larger cycle of time is described where matter (mahat-tattva or universal womb) is created from primal matter (prakriti) and root matter (pradhana) every 622.08 trillion years, from which Brahma is born. The elements of the universe are created, used by Brahma, and fully dissolved within a maha-kalpa (life of Brahma; 100 of his 360-day years) period lasting for 311.04 trillion years containing 36,000 kalpas (days) and pralayas (nights), and is followed by a maha-pralaya period of full dissolution equal in duration. The texts also speak of innumerable worlds or universes.
- 2nd century CE – Ptolemy proposes an Earth-centered universe, with the Sun, Moon, and visible planets revolving around the Earth. Based on Apollonius' epicycles, he calculates the positions, orbits and positional equations of the Heavenly bodies along with instruments to measure these quantities. Ptolemy emphasised that the epicycle motion does not apply to the Sun. His main contribution to the model was the equant points. He also re-arranged the heavenly spheres in a different order than Plato did (from Earth outward): Moon, Mercury, Venus, Sun, Mars, Jupiter, Saturn and fixed stars, following a long astrological tradition and the decreasing orbital periods. His book The Almagest, which also cataloged 1,022 stars and other astronomical objects (largely based upon Hipparchus'), remained the most authoritative text on astronomy and largest astronomical catalogue until the 17th century.

== Middle Ages ==
- 2nd century CE-5th century CE – Jain cosmology considers the loka, or universe, as an uncreated entity, existing since infinity, the shape of the universe as similar to a man standing with legs apart and arm resting on his waist. This Universe, according to Jainism, is broad at the top, narrow at the middle and once again becomes broad at the bottom.
- 5th century (or earlier) – Buddhist texts speak of "hundreds of thousands of billions, countlessly, innumerably, boundlessly, incomparably, incalculably, unspeakably, inconceivably, immeasurably, inexplicably many worlds" to the east, and "infinite worlds in the ten directions".
- 5th century Aryabhata writes a treatise on motion of planets, Sun and Moon and stars. Aryabhatta puts forward the theory of rotation of the Earth in its own axis and explained day and night was caused by the diurnal rotation of the Earth. He models a geocentric universe with the sun, moon, and planets following circular and eccentric orbits with epicycles.
- 5th century – The Jewish talmud gives an argument for finite universe theory along with explanation.

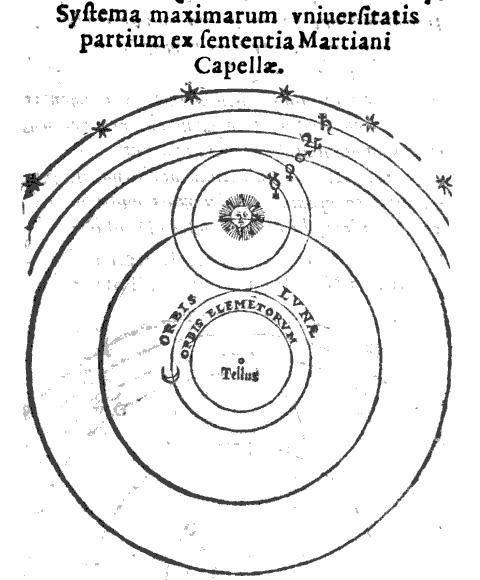
Naboth's representation of Martianus Capella's geo-heliocentric astronomical model (1573)

- 5th century – Martianus Capella describes a modified geocentric model, in which the Earth is at rest in the center of the universe and circled by the Moon, the Sun, three planets and the stars, while Mercury and Venus circle the Sun, all surrounded by the sphere of fixed stars.
- 6th century – John Philoponus proposes a universe that is finite in time and argues against the ancient Greek notion of an infinite universe
- 7th century – The Quran says in Chapter 21: Verse 30 – "Have those who disbelieved not considered that the Heavens and the Earth were a joined entity, and We separated them".
- 9th–12th centuries – Al-Kindi (Alkindus), Saadia Gaon (Saadia ben Joseph) and Al-Ghazali (Algazel) support a universe that has a finite past and develop two logical arguments for the notion.
- 12th century – Fakhr al-Din al-Razi discusses Islamic cosmology. In his commentary on the Quranic expression "Lord of the Worlds", Al-Razi advocates (against Aristotelian and Avicennan arguments) that worlds or universes could exist beyond this one if God created them.
- 12th century – Robert Grosseteste described the birth of the Universe in an explosion and the crystallisation of matter. He also put forward several new ideas such as rotation of the Earth around its axis and the cause of day and night. His treatise De Luce is the first attempt to describe the heavens and Earth using a single set of physical laws.
- 14th century – Jewish astronomer Levi ben Gershon (Gersonides) estimates the distance to the outermost orb of the fixed stars to be no less than 159,651,513,380,944 Earth radii, or about 100,000 light-years in modern units.
- 14th century – Several European mathematicians and astronomers develop the theory of Earth's rotation including Nicole Oresme. Oresme also give logical reasoning, empirical evidence and mathematical proofs for his notion.
- 15th century – Nicholas of Cusa proposes that the Earth rotates on its axis in his book, On Learned Ignorance (1440). Like Oresme, he also wrote about the possibility of the plurality of worlds.

== Renaissance ==
- 1501 – Indian astronomer Nilakantha Somayaji proposes a universe in which the planets orbit the Sun, but the Sun orbits the Earth.

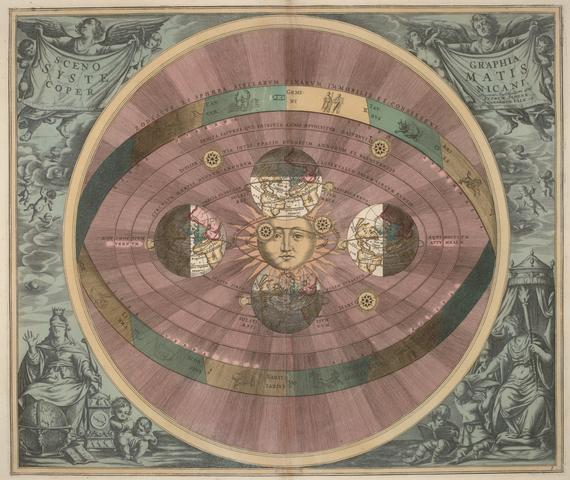
Andreas Cellarius's illustration of the Copernican system, from the Harmonia Macrocosmica

- 1543 – Nicolaus Copernicus publishes his heliocentric universe in his De revolutionibus orbium coelestium.
- 1576 – Thomas Digges modifies the Copernican system by removing its outer edge and replacing the edge with a star-filled unbounded space.
- 1584 – Giordano Bruno proposes a non-hierarchical cosmology, wherein the Copernican Solar System is not the center of the universe, but rather, a relatively insignificant star system, amongst an infinite multitude of others.

== Scientific Revolution ==
- 1588 – Tycho Brahe publishes his own Tychonic system, a blend between Ptolemy's classical geocentric model and Copernicus' heliocentric model, in which the Sun and the Moon revolve around the Earth, in the center of universe, and all other planets revolve around the Sun. It is a geo-heliocentric model similar to that described by Somayaji.
- 1600 – William Gilbert rejects the idea of a limiting sphere of the fixed stars for which no proof has been offered.
- 1609 – Galileo Galilei examines the skies and constellations through a telescope and concluded that the "fixed stars" which had been studied and mapped were only a tiny portion of the massive universe that lay beyond the reach of the naked eye. When in 1610 he aimed his telescope to the faint strip of the Milky Way, he found it resolves into countless white star-like spots, presumably farther stars themselves.
- 1610 – Johannes Kepler uses the dark night sky to argue for a finite universe. Shortly after, it was proved by Kepler himself that the Jupiter's moons move around the planet the same way planets orbit the Sun, thus making Kepler's laws universal.
- 1659 – Christiaan Huygens makes precise measurements of the angular distance between the Sun and Venus, which were based on the first absolute measurements of the Astronomical unit.
- 1672 – Jean Richer and Giovanni Domenico Cassini measure the Earth-Sun distance, the astronomical unit, to be about 138,370,000 km. Later it will be refined by others up to the current value of 149,597,870 km.
- 1675 – Ole Rømer uses the orbital mechanics of Jupiter's moons to estimate that the speed of light is about 227,000 km/s.
- 1687 – Isaac Newton's laws describe large-scale motion throughout the universe. The universal force of gravity suggested that stars could not simply be fixed or at rest, as their gravitational pulls cause "mutual attraction" and therefore cause them to move in relation to each other.
- 1692 – Richard Bentley puts forth Bentley's paradox, the idea that Newtonian gravity is unstable.

== Enlightenment to Victorian Era ==
- 1704 – John Locke enters the term "Solar System" in the English language, when he used it to refer to the Sun, planets, and comets as a whole. By then it had been stablished beyond doubt that planets are other worlds, and stars are other distant suns, so the whole Solar System is actually only a small part of an immensely large universe, and definitively something distinct.
- 1718 – Edmund Halley discovers proper motion of stars, dispelling the concept of the "fixed stars".
- 1720 – Edmund Halley puts forth an early form of Olbers' paradox (if the universe is infinite, every line of sight would end at a star, thus the night sky would be entirely bright).
- 1729 – James Bradley discovers the aberration of light, which proved the Earth's motion around the Sun, and also provides a more accurate method to compute the speed of light closer to its actual value of about 300,000 km/s.
- 1744 – Jean-Philippe de Cheseaux puts forth an early form of Olbers' paradox.
- 1755 – Immanuel Kant asserts that the nebulae are really galaxies separate from, independent of, and outside the Milky Way Galaxy; he calls them island universes.

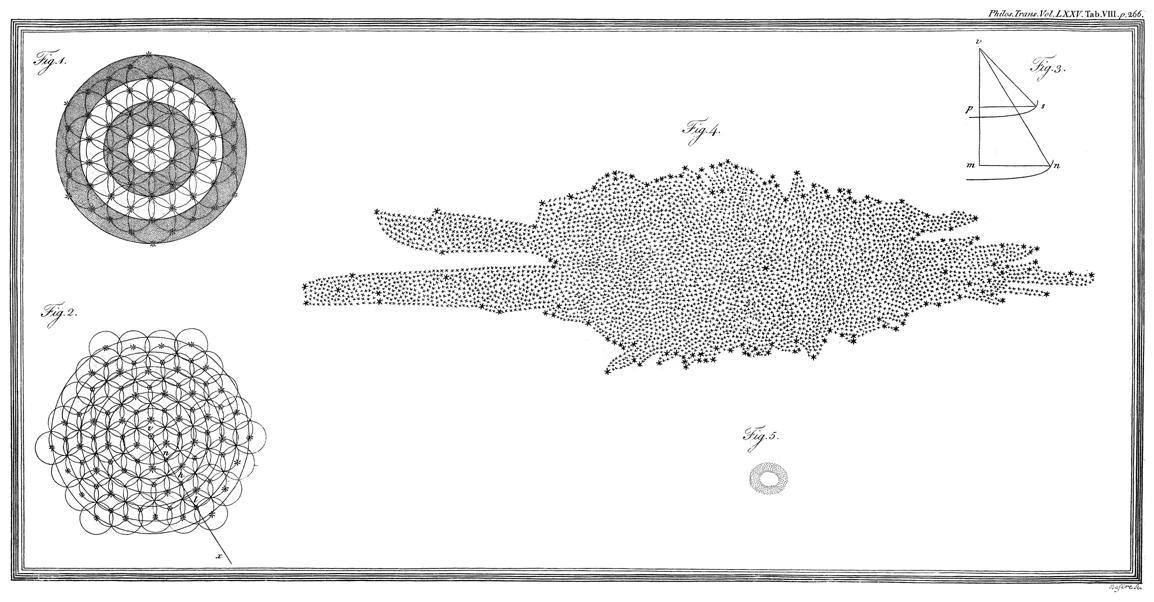
William Herschel's model of the Milky Way, 1785

- 1781 – Charles Messier and his assistant Pierre Méchain publish the first catalogue of 110 nebulae and star clusters, the most prominent deep-sky objects that can easily be observed from Earth's Northern Hemisphere, in order not to be confused with ordinary Solar System's comets.
- 1785 – William Herschel proposes a heliocentric model of the universe that the Sun is at or near the center of the universe, which at the time was assumed to only be the Milky Way Galaxy.
- 1791 – Erasmus Darwin pens the first description of a cyclical expanding and contracting universe in his poem The Economy of Vegetation.
- 1796 – Pierre Laplace re-states the nebular hypothesis for the formation of the Solar System from a spinning nebula of gas and dust.
- 1826 – Heinrich Wilhelm Olbers puts forth Olbers' paradox.
- 1832–1838 – Following over 100 years of unsuccessful attempts, Thomas Henderson, Friedrich Bessel, and Otto Struve measure the parallax of a few nearby stars; these are the first measurements of any distances outside the Solar System.

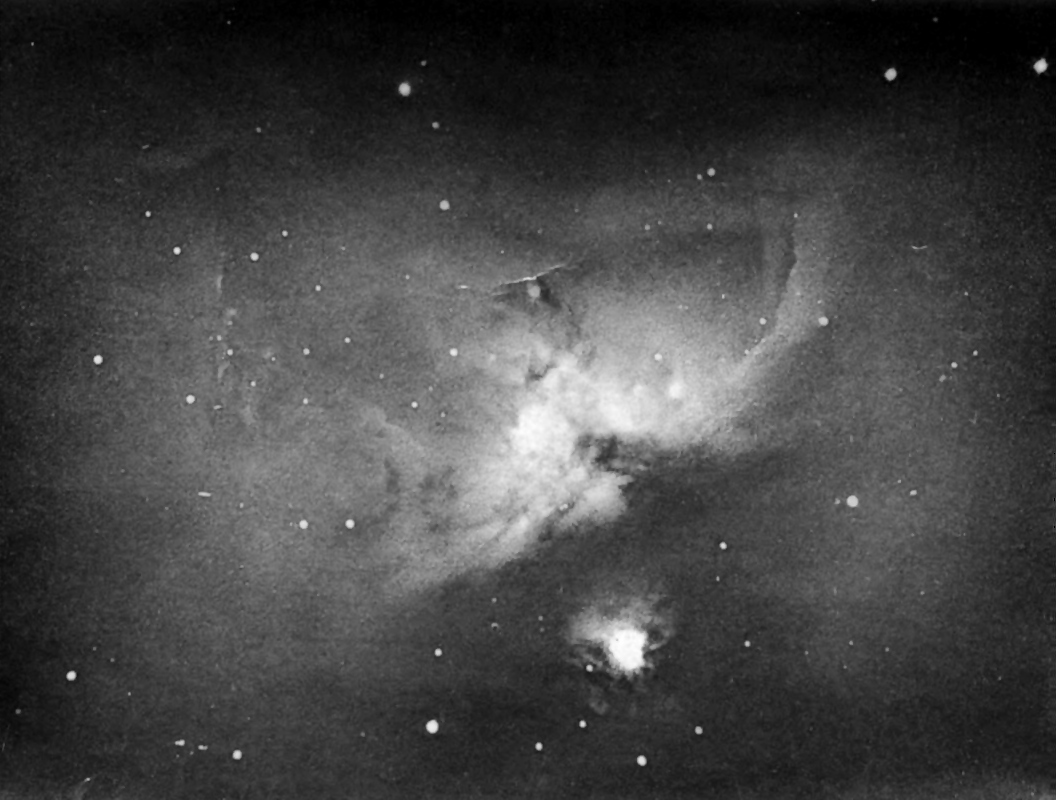
One of Andrew Ainslie Common's 1883 photographs of the Orion Nebula, the first to show that a long exposure could record stars and nebulae invisible to the human eye.

- 1842 – Christian Doppler proposes the redshift and blueshift effects, based on an analog effect found in sound. Hippolyte Fizeau discovered independently the same phenomenon on electromagnetic waves in 1848.
- 1852 –William Thomson, 1st Baron Kelvin puts forward the problem of the heat death of the universe
- 1848 – Edgar Allan Poe offers first correct solution to Olbers' paradox in Eureka: A Prose Poem, an essay that also suggests the expansion and collapse of the universe.
- 1860s – William Huggins develops astronomical spectroscopy; he shows that the Orion Nebula is mostly made of gas, while the Andromeda nebula (later called Andromeda Galaxy) is probably dominated by stars.
- 1862 – By analysing the spectroscopic signature of the Sun and comparing it to those of other stars, Father Angelo Secchi determines that the Sun in itself is also a star.
- 1862 – Lord Kelvin solves the heat death paradox.
- 1887 – The Michelson–Morley experiment, intended to measure the relative motion of Earth through the (assumed) stationary luminiferous aether, got no results. This started the decline of centuries-old idea of the aether, dating back to Aristotle, and with it all the contemporary aether theories. With the theory being abandoned entirely around the early 1920s.
- 1897 – J. J. Thomson identifies the electrons as the constituent particles of the cathode rays, leading to the modern atomic model of matter.
- 1897 – William Thomson, 1st Baron Kelvin, based on the thermal radiation rate and the gravitational contraction forces, argues the age of the Sun to be no more than 20 million years – unless some energy source beyond what was then known was found.

== 1901–1950 ==
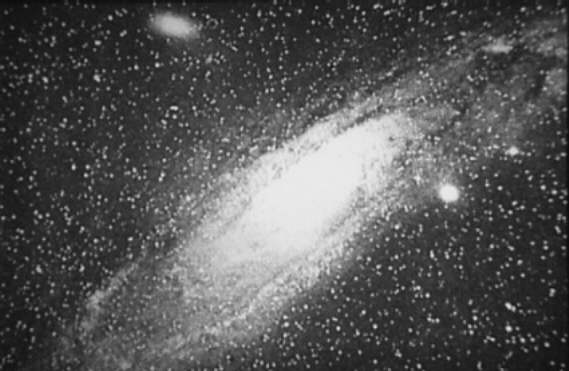
The earliest known photograph of the Great Andromeda "Nebula" (with M110 to upper left), by Isaac Roberts, 1899.

- 1902 – Carl Charlier proposes his hierarchical model to solve Olbers and Bentley's paradoxes.
- 1904 – Ernest Rutherford argues, in a lecture attended by Kelvin, that radioactive decay releases heat, providing the unknown energy source Kelvin had suggested, and ultimately leading to radiometric dating of rocks which reveals ages of billions of years for the Solar System bodies, hence the Sun and all the stars.
- 1905 – Albert Einstein publishes the special theory relativity, positing that space and time are not separate continua, and demonstrating that mass and energy are interchangeable.
- 1912 – Henrietta Leavitt discovers the period-luminosity law for Cepheid variable stars, which becomes a crucial step in measuring distances to other galaxies.
- 1913 – Niels Bohr publishes the Bohr model of the atom, which explains the spectral lines, and definitively established the quantum mechanics behaviour of the matter.
- 1915 – Robert Innes discovers Proxima Centauri, the closest star to Earth after the Sun.
- 1915 – Albert Einstein publishes the General Theory of Relativity, showing that an energy density warps spacetime.
- 1917 – Willem de Sitter derives an isotropic static cosmology with a cosmological constant, as well as an empty expanding cosmology with a cosmological constant, termed a de Sitter universe.
- 1918 – Harlow Shapley's work on globular clusters showed that the heliocentrism model of cosmology was wrong, and galactocentrism replaced heliocentrism as the dominant model of cosmology.
- 1919 – Arthur Stanley Eddington uses a solar eclipse to successfully test Albert Einstein's General Theory of Relativity.
- 1920 – The Shapley-Curtis Debate, on the distances to spiral nebulae, takes place at the Smithsonian.
- 1921 – The National Research Council (NRC) published the official transcript of the Shapley-Curtis Debate. Galaxies are finally recognized as objects beyond the Milky Way, and the Milky Way as a galaxy proper.
- 1922 – Vesto Slipher summarizes his findings on the spiral nebulae's systematic redshifts.
- 1922 – Alexander Friedmann finds a solution to the Einstein field equations which suggests a general expansion of space.
- 1923 – Edwin Hubble measures distances to a few nearby spiral nebulae (galaxies), the Andromeda Galaxy (M31), Triangulum Galaxy (M33), and NGC 6822. The distances place them far outside the Milky Way, and implies that fainter galaxies are much more distant, and the universe is composed of many thousands of galaxies.
- 1924 – Louis de Broglie asserts that moderately accelerated electrons must show an associated wave. This was later confirmed by the Davisson–Germer experiment in 1927.
- 1927 – Georges Lemaître discusses the creation event of an expanding universe governed by the Einstein field equations. From its solutions to the Einstein equations, he predicts the distance-redshift relation.
- 1928 – Paul Dirac realises that his relativistic version of the Schrödinger wave equation for electrons predicts the possibility of antielectrons, and hence antimatter. This was confirmed in 1932 by Carl D. Anderson.
- 1928 – Howard P. Robertson briefly mentions that Vesto Slipher's redshift measurements combined with brightness measurements of the same galaxies indicate a redshift-distance relation.

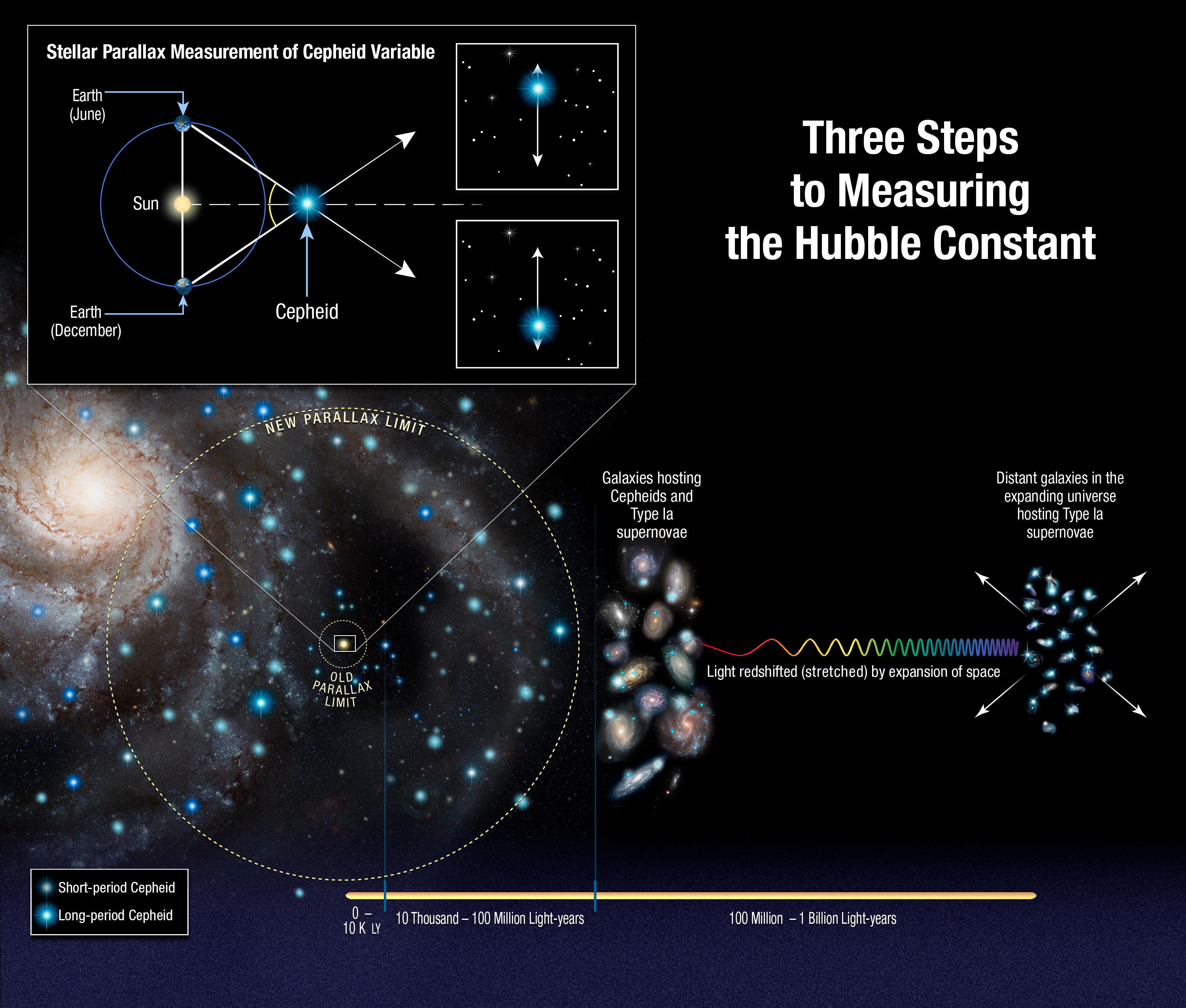
Three steps to the Hubble constant

- 1929 – Edwin Hubble demonstrates the linear redshift-distance relationship and thus shows the expansion of the universe.
- 1932 – Karl Guthe Jansky recognizes received radio signals coming from outer space as extrasolar, coming mainly from Sagittarius. They are the first evidence of the center of the Milky Way, and the firsts experiences that founded the discipline of radio astronomy.
- 1933 – Edward Milne names and formalizes the cosmological principle.
- 1933 – Fritz Zwicky shows that the Coma Cluster of galaxies contains large amounts of dark matter. This result agrees with modern measurements, but is generally ignored until the 1970s.
- 1934 – Georges Lemaître interprets the cosmological constant as due to a vacuum energy with an unusual perfect fluid equation of state.
- 1938 – Hans Bethe calculates the details of the two main energy-producing nuclear reactions that power the stars.
- 1938 – Paul Dirac suggests the large numbers hypothesis, that the gravitational constant may be small because it is decreasing slowly with time.
- 1948 – Ralph Alpher, Hans Bethe ("in absentia"), and George Gamow examine element synthesis in a rapidly expanding and cooling universe, and suggest that the elements were produced by rapid neutron capture.
- 1948 – Hermann Bondi, Thomas Gold, and Fred Hoyle propose steady state cosmologies based on the perfect cosmological principle.
- 1948 – George Gamow predicts the existence of the cosmic microwave background radiation by considering the behavior of primordial radiation in an expanding universe.
- 1950 – Fred Hoyle coins the term "Big Bang", saying that it was not derisive; it was just a striking image meant to highlight the difference between that and the Steady-State model.

== 1951–2000 ==
- 1961 – Robert Dicke argues that carbon-based life can only arise when the gravitational force is small, because this is when burning stars exist; first use of the weak anthropic principle.
- 1963 – Maarten Schmidt discovers the first quasar; these soon provide a probe of the universe back to substantial redshifts.
- 1965 – Hannes Alfvén proposes the now-discounted concept of ambiplasma to explain baryon asymmetry and supports the idea of an infinite universe.
- 1965 – Martin Rees and Dennis Sciama analyze quasar source count data and discover that the quasar density increases with redshift.
- 1965 – Arno Penzias and Robert Wilson, astronomers at Bell Labs discover the 2.7 K microwave background radiation, which earns them the 1978 Nobel Prize in Physics. Robert Dicke, James Peebles, Peter Roll and David Todd Wilkinson interpret it as a relic from the Big Bang.

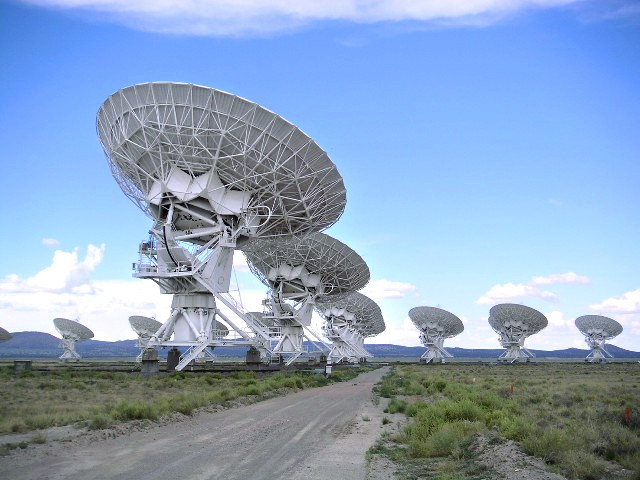
The Karl G. Jansky Very Large Array, a radio interferometer in New Mexico, United States.

- 1966 – Stephen Hawking and George Ellis show that any plausible general relativistic cosmology is singular.
- 1966 – James Peebles shows that the hot Big Bang predicts the correct helium abundance.
- 1967 – Andrei Sakharov presents the requirements for baryogenesis, a baryon-antibaryon asymmetry in the universe.
- 1967 – John Bahcall, Wal Sargent, and Maarten Schmidt measure the fine-structure splitting of spectral lines in 3C191 and thereby show that the fine-structure constant does not vary significantly with time.
- 1967 – Robert Wagner, William Fowler, and Fred Hoyle show that the hot Big Bang predicts the correct deuterium and lithium abundances.
- 1968 – Brandon Carter speculates that perhaps the fundamental constants of nature must lie within a restricted range to allow the emergence of life; first use of the strong anthropic principle.
- 1969 – Charles Misner formally presents the Big Bang horizon problem.
- 1969 – Robert Dicke formally presents the Big Bang flatness problem.
- 1970 – Vera Rubin and Kent Ford measure spiral galaxy rotation curves at large radii, showing evidence for substantial amounts of dark matter.
- 1973 – Edward Tryon proposes that the universe may be a large scale quantum mechanical vacuum fluctuation where positive mass-energy is balanced by negative gravitational potential energy.
- 1976 – Alexander Shlyakhter uses samarium ratios from the Oklo prehistoric natural nuclear fission reactor in Gabon to show that some laws of physics have remained unchanged for over two billion years.
- 1977 – Gary Steigman, David Schramm, and James Gunn examine the relation between the primordial helium abundance and number of neutrinos and claim that at most five lepton families can exist.
- 1980 – Alan Guth and Alexei Starobinsky independently propose the inflationary Big Bang universe as a possible solution to the horizon and flatness problems.
- 1981 – Viatcheslav Mukhanov and G. Chibisov propose that quantum fluctuations could lead to large scale structure in an inflationary universe.
- 1982 – The first CfA galaxy redshift survey is completed.
- 1982 – Several groups including James Peebles, J. Richard Bond and George Blumenthal propose that the universe is dominated by cold dark matter.
- 1983–1987 – The first large computer simulations of cosmic structure formation are run by Davis, Efstathiou, Frenk and White. The results show that cold dark matter produces a reasonable match to observations, but hot dark matter does not.

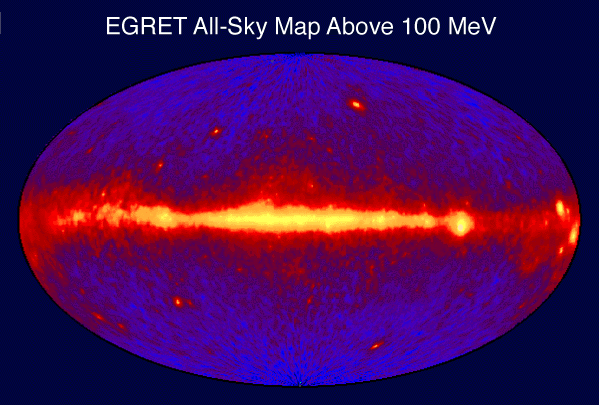
The sky at energies above 100 MeV observed by the Energetic Gamma Ray Experiment Telescope (EGRET) of the Compton Gamma Ray Observatory (CGRO) satellite (1991–2000).

- 1988 – The CfA2 Great Wall is discovered in the CfA2 redshift survey.
- 1988 – Measurements of galaxy large-scale flows provide evidence for the Great Attractor.
- 1990 – The Hubble Space Telescope is launched. It is aimed primarily at deep-space objects.
- 1990 – Preliminary results from NASA's COBE mission confirm the cosmic microwave background radiation has a blackbody spectrum to an astonishing one part in 10^{5} precision, thus eliminating the possibility of an integrated starlight model proposed for the background by steady state enthusiasts.
- 1992 – Further COBE measurements discover the very small anisotropy of the cosmic microwave background, providing a "baby picture" of the seeds of large-scale structure when the universe was around 1/1100th of its present size and 380,000 years old.
- 1992 – First planetary system beyond the Solar System detected, around the pulsar PSR B1257+12.
- 1995 – The first planet around a Sun-like star is discovered, in orbit around the star 51 Pegasi.
- 1996 – The first Hubble Deep Field is released, providing a clear view of very distant galaxies when the universe was around one-third of its present age.
- 1998 – Controversial evidence for the fine-structure constant varying over the lifetime of the universe is first published.
- 1998 – The Supernova Cosmology Project and High-Z Supernova Search Team discover cosmic acceleration based on distances to Type Ia supernovae, providing the first direct evidence for a non-zero cosmological constant.
- 1999 – Measurements of the cosmic microwave background radiation with finer resolution than COBE, (most notably by the BOOMERanG experiment see Mauskopf et al., 1999, Melchiorri et al., 1999, de Bernardis et al. 2000) provide evidence for oscillations (the first acoustic peak) in the anisotropy angular spectrum, as expected in the standard model of cosmological structure formation. The angular position of this peak indicates that the geometry of the universe is close to flat.

== 2001–present ==
- 2001 – The 2dF Galaxy Redshift Survey (2dF) by an Australian/British team gave strong evidence that the matter density is near 25% of critical density. Together with the CMB results for a flat universe, this provides independent evidence for a cosmological constant or similar dark energy.
- 2002 – The Cosmic Background Imager (CBI) in Chile obtained images of the cosmic microwave background radiation with the highest angular resolution of 4 arc minutes. It also obtained the anisotropy spectrum at high-resolution not covered before up to l ~ 3000. It found a slight excess in power at high-resolution (l > 2500) not yet completely explained, the so-called "CBI-excess".
- 2003 – NASA's Wilkinson Microwave Anisotropy Probe (WMAP) obtained full-sky detailed pictures of the cosmic microwave background radiation. The images can be interpreted to indicate that the universe is 13.7 billion years old (within one percent error), and are very consistent with the Lambda-CDM model and the density fluctuations predicted by inflation.

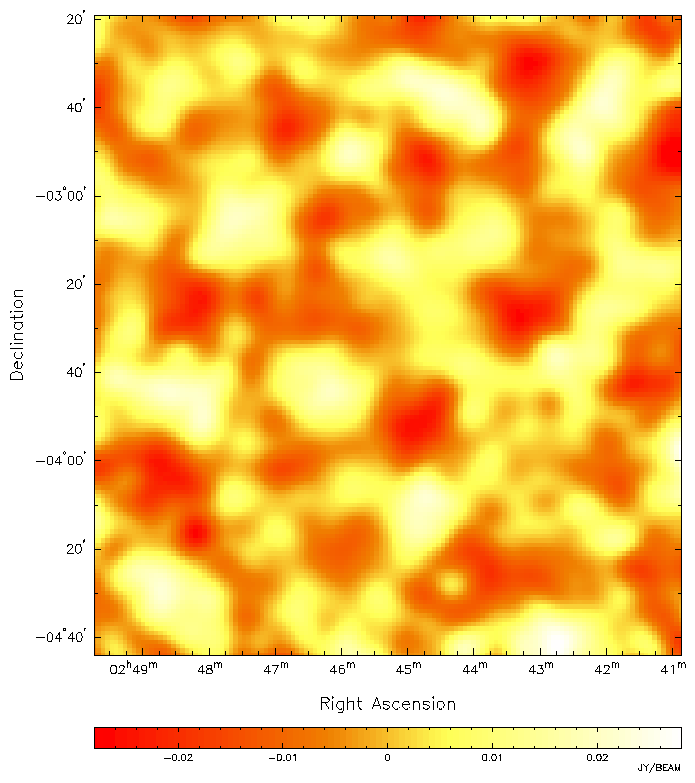
Cosmic microwave background as measured by the Cosmic Background Imager experiment.

- 2003 – The Sloan Great Wall is discovered.
- 2004 – The Degree Angular Scale Interferometer (DASI) first obtained the E-mode polarization spectrum of the cosmic microwave background radiation.
- 2004 – Voyager 1 sends back the first data ever obtained from within the Solar System's heliosheath.
- 2005 – The Sloan Digital Sky Survey (SDSS) and 2dF redshift surveys both detected the baryon acoustic oscillation feature in the galaxy distribution, a key prediction of cold dark matter models.
- 2006 – Three-year WMAP results are released, confirming previous analysis, correcting several points, and including polarization data.
- 2009–2013 – Planck, a space observatory operated by the European Space Agency (ESA), mapped the anisotropies of the cosmic microwave background radiation, with increased sensitivity and small angular resolution.
- 2006–2011 – Improved measurements from WMAP, new supernova surveys ESSENCE and SNLS, and baryon acoustic oscillations from SDSS and WiggleZ, continue to be consistent with the standard Lambda-CDM model.
- 2014 – Astrophysicists of the BICEP2 collaboration announce the detection of inflationary gravitational waves in the B-mode power spectrum, which if confirmed, would provide clear experimental evidence for the theory of inflation. However, in June lowered confidence in confirming the cosmic inflation findings was reported.
- 2016 – LIGO Scientific Collaboration and Virgo Collaboration announce that gravitational waves were directly detected by two LIGO detectors. The waveform matched the prediction of General relativity for a gravitational wave emanating from the inward spiral and merger of a pair of black holes of around 36 and 29 solar masses and the subsequent "ringdown" of the single resulting black hole. The second detection verified that GW150914 is not a fluke, thus opens entire new branch in astrophysics, gravitational-wave astronomy.
- 2019 – The Event Horizon Telescope Collaboration publishes the image of the black hole at the center of the M87 Galaxy. This is the first time astronomers have ever captured an image of a black hole, which once again proves the existence of black holes and thus helps verify Einstein's general theory of relativity. This was done by utilising very-long-baseline interferometry.
- 2020 – Physicist Lucas Lombriser of the University of Geneva presents a possible way of reconciling the two significantly different determinations of the Hubble constant by proposing the notion of a surrounding vast "bubble", 250 million light years in diameter, that is half the density of the rest of the universe.
- 2020 – Scientists publish a study which suggests that the Universe is no longer expanding at the same rate in all directions and that therefore the widely accepted isotropy hypothesis might be wrong. While previous studies already suggested this, the study is the first to examine galaxy clusters in X-rays and, according to Norbert Schartel, has a much greater significance. The study found a consistent and strong directional behavior of deviations – which have earlier been described to indicate a "crisis of cosmology" by others – of the normalization parameter A, or the Hubble constant H0. Beyond the potential cosmological implications, it shows that studies which assume perfect isotropy in the properties of galaxy clusters and their scaling relations can produce strongly biased results.
- 2020 – Scientists report verifying measurements 2011–2014 via ULAS J1120+0641 of what seem to be a spatial variation in four measurements of the fine-structure constant, a basic physical constant used to measure electromagnetism between charged particles, which indicates that there might be directionality with varying natural constants in the Universe which would have implications for theories on the emergence of habitability of the Universe and be at odds with the widely accepted theory of constant natural laws and the standard model of cosmology which is based on an isotropic Universe.
- 2021 – James Webb Space Telescope is launched.

== See also ==
- Cosmology

=== Physical cosmology ===
- Chronology of the universe
- List of cosmologists
- Interpretations of quantum mechanics
- Non-standard cosmology

=== Historical development of hypotheses ===
- Timeline of Solar System astronomy
- Timeline of knowledge about galaxies, clusters of galaxies, and large-scale structure
- Timeline of cosmic microwave background astronomy
- Historical models of the Solar System
- Fixed stars

=== Belief systems ===
- Buddhist cosmology
- Jain cosmology
- Jainism and non-creationism
- Hindu cosmology
- Maya mythology

=== Others ===
- Cosmology@Home

== Bibliography ==
- Bunch, Bryan, and Alexander Hellemans, The History of Science and Technology: A Browser's Guide to the Great Discoveries, Inventions, and the People Who Made Them from the Dawn of Time to Today. ISBN 0-618-22123-9
- P. de Bernardis et al., astro-ph/0004404, Nature 404 (2000) 955–959.
- Horowitz, Wayne (1998). Mesopotamian cosmic geography. Eisenbrauns. ISBN 978-0-931464-99-7.
- P. Mauskopf et al., astro-ph/9911444, Astrophys. J. 536 (2000) L59–L62.
- A. Melchiorri et al., astro-ph/9911445, Astrophys. J. 536 (2000) L63–L66.
- A. Readhead et al., Polarization observations with the Cosmic Background Imager, Science 306 (2004), 836–844.
