= Fixed stars =

Type of astronomical bodies

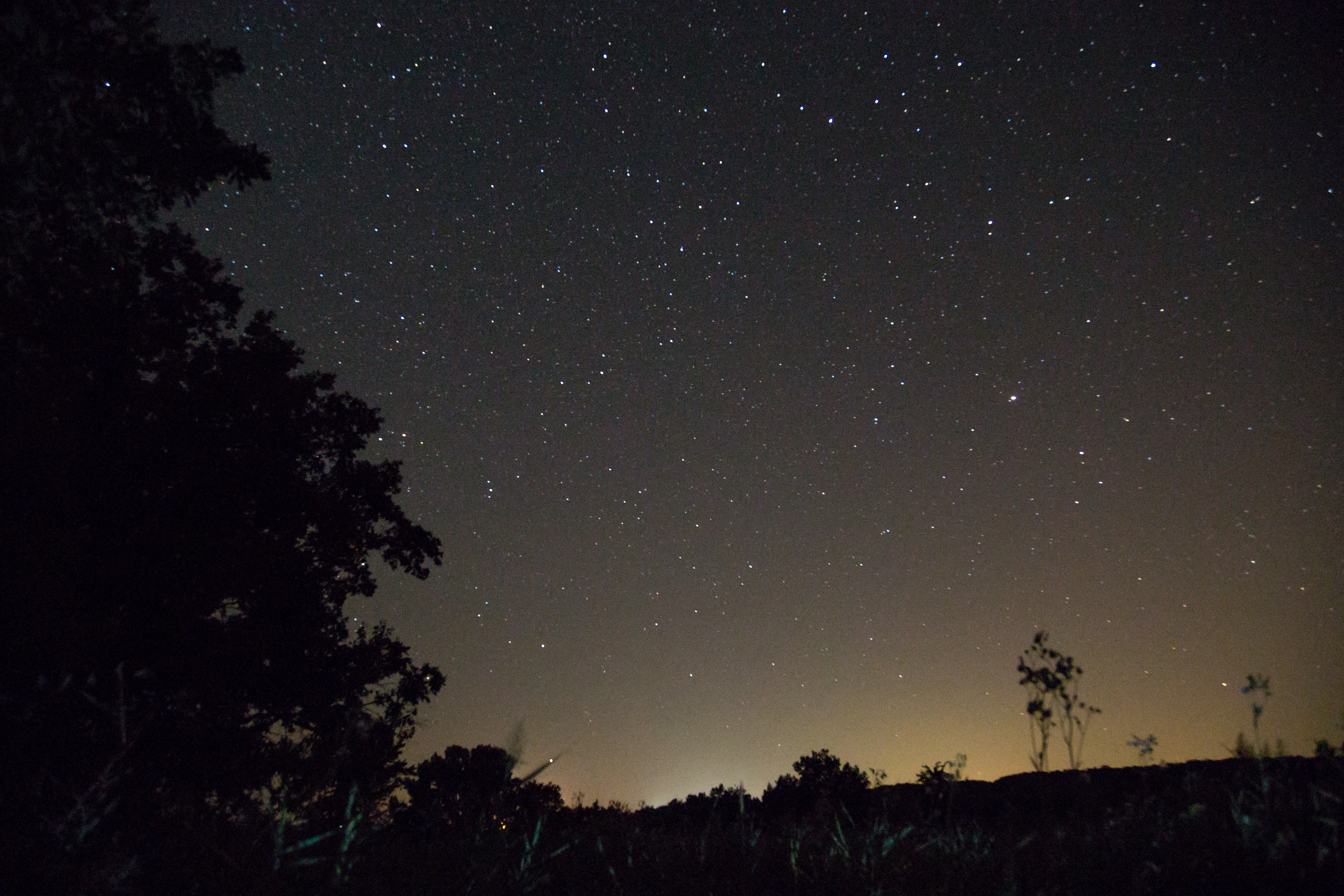
Stars in the night sky appear to be attached to a dark background, the celestial dome

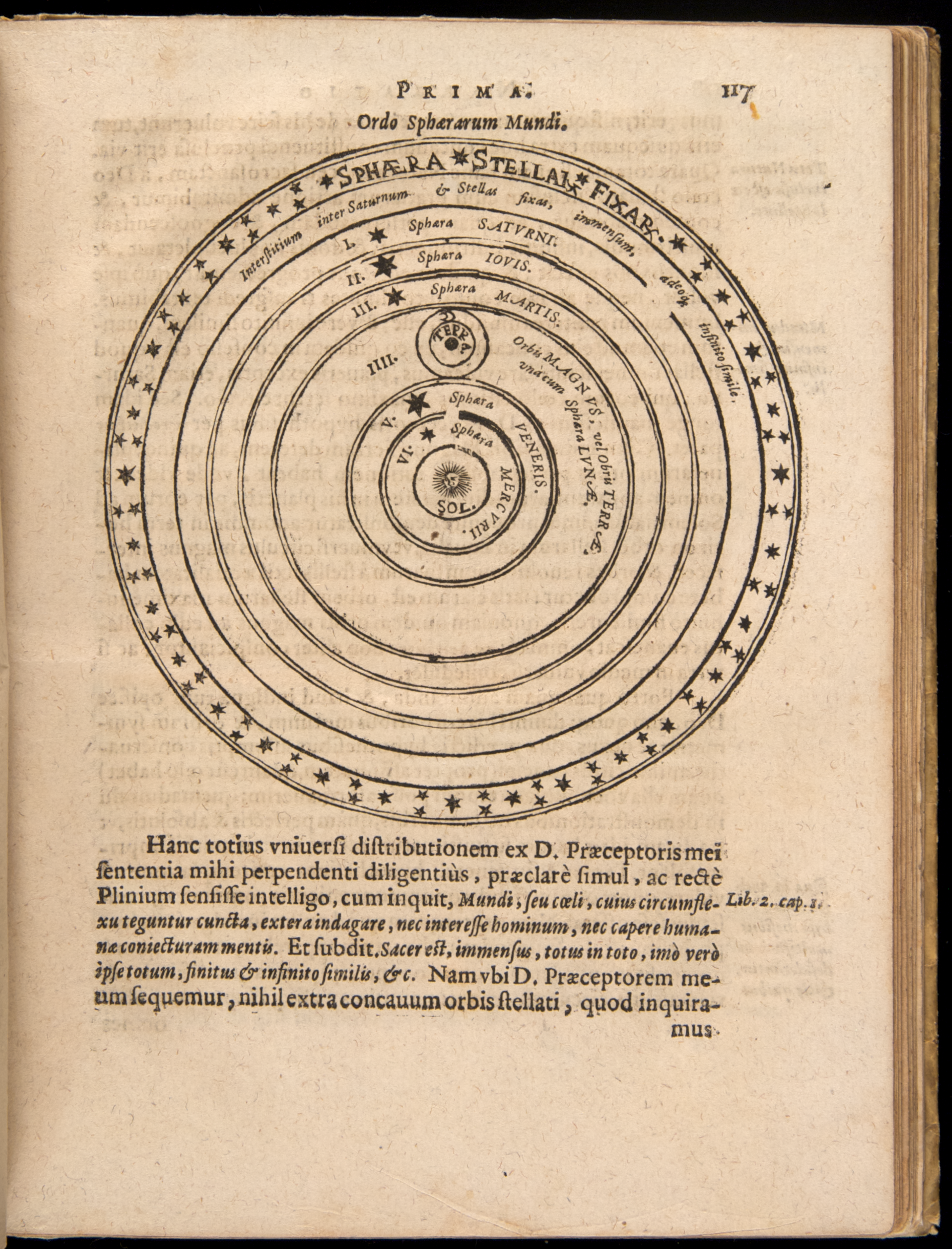
Kepler, Johannes. Mysterium Cosmographicum, 1596. Kepler's heliocentric rendition of the cosmos, containing an outermost "sphaera stellarum fixarum," or sphere of fixed stars.

In astronomy, the fixed stars (Latin: stellae fixae) are the lights (luminary points), mainly stars visible to the naked eye, that appear not to move relative to each other against the dark background of the night sky. They are defined in contrast to lights that appear to move relative to each other and to the fixed stars, which include classical planets and comets. The fixed stars include all the stars visible to the naked eye other than the Sun, as well as the faint band of the Milky Way. Due to their star-like appearance when viewed with the naked eye, the few visible individual nebulae and other deep-sky objects are also counted among the fixed stars. Approximately 6,000 stars are visible to the naked eye under optimal conditions.

The term fixed stars is a misnomer because those celestial objects are not actually fixed with respect to one another or to Earth. Due to their immense distance from Earth, these objects appear to move so slowly in the sky that the change in their relative positions is nearly imperceptible on human timescales, except under careful examination with modern instruments, such as telescopes, that can reveal their proper motions. Hence, they can be considered to be "fixed" for many purposes, such as navigation, charting of stars, astrometry, and timekeeping.

Due to the large distances of astronomical objects, human vision is unable to perceive the three-dimensional depth of outer space, giving the impression that all stars and other extrasolar objects are equidistant from the observer. In the astronomical tradition of Aristotelian physics which spanned from ancient Greece to early scientific Europe, the fixed stars were believed to exist attached on a giant celestial sphere, or firmament, which revolves daily around Earth. Hence it was known as the "sphere of fixed stars", which acted as the supposed limit of the whole universe. For many centuries, the term fixed stars was a synonym for that celestial sphere.

Many ancient cultures observed new stars now called novas, which provided some clue the heavens were not completely unchanging, but as novae fade in a few weeks or months, the phenomenon was not understood then, as well as that of comets. In European scientific astronomy, evidence that disproved the firmament was gathered gradually. The Copernican Revolution of the 1540s fueled the idea held by some philosophers in ancient Greece and the Islamic world that stars were actually other suns, possibly with their own planets. The definitive discovery of proper motion was announced in 1718, and parallax was suspected in the 1670s but shown definitively in the 1830s. Other cultures (such as Chinese astronomy) either never had a belief in a sphere of fixed stars, or constructed it in different ways. (See Cosmology § Historical cosmologies.)

People in many cultures have imagined that the brightest stars form constellations, which are apparent pictures in the sky seeming to be persistent, being deemed also as fixed. That way, constellations have been used for centuries, and still are today, to identify regions of the night sky by both professional and amateur astronomers.

== Astronomical models which included fixed stars ==
=== Pythagoreans ===
Pythagorean philosophers held a number of different views on the structure of the universe, but each included a sphere of fixed stars as its boundary. Philolaos (c. 5th cent. BC) proposed a universe which had at its center a central fire, invisible to man. All of the planets, the Moon, Sun, and stars rotated about this central fire, with the Earth being the nearest object to it. In this system, the stars are contained in the furthest sphere, which also rotates, but too slowly for motion to be observed. The motion of the stars is instead explained by the motion of the Earth about the central fire.

Another Pythagorean, Ecphantos of Syracuse (c. 400 BC) proposed a system quite similar to that of Philolaos, but without a central fire. Instead, this cosmos was centered on the Earth, which remained stationary but rotated on an axis, while the Moon, Sun, and planets revolved about it. This system's final boundary was a fixed sphere of stars, and the perceived motion of the stars was thought to be caused by the rotation of the Earth.

=== Plato ===
Plato's (c. 429 – c. 347 BC) universe was centered on a completely stationary Earth, constructed with a series of concentric spheres. The outer sphere of this system consisted of fire and contained all of the planets (which according to Plato, included the Moon and Sun). The outermost portion of this sphere was the location of the stars. This sphere of fire rotated about the Earth, carrying the stars with it. The belief that the stars were fixed in their place in the sphere of fire was of great importance to all of Plato's system. The stars' position was used as a reference for all celestial motions and used to create Plato's ideas of planets possessing multiple motions.

=== Eudoxus of Cnidus ===
Eudoxus, a student of Plato, was born around 400 BC. A mathematician and an astronomer, he generated one of the earliest sphere-centric models of the planet systems, based on his background as a mathematician. Eudoxus's model was geocentric, with the Earth being a stationary sphere at the center of the system, surrounded by 27 rotating spheres. The farthest sphere carried stars, which he declared to be fixed within the sphere. Thus, though the stars were moved around the Earth by the sphere which they occupied, they themselves did not move and were therefore considered fixed.

=== Aristotle ===
Aristotle, who lived from 384 to 322 BC studied and published similar ideas to Plato, and based on the Eudoxus' system, but he improved on them through his books Metaphysics and On the Heavens written around 350 BC. He claimed that all things have some way of moving, (including "heavenly bodies," or planets,) but he denies that the movement could be caused by a vacuum, because then the objects would move much too fast and without sensible directions. He stated that everything was moved by something and started exploring a concept similar to gravity. He was one of the first to argue (and prove) that the Earth was round, drawing on observations of eclipses and the movements of the other planets relative to the Earth. He proceeded to conclude that most planets navigated in a circular motion.

His cosmos was geocentric, with the Earth at the center, surrounded by a layer of water and air, which was in turn surrounded by a layer of fire which filled the space until reaching the Moon. Aristotle also proposed a fifth element called "aether," which is purported to make up the Sun, the planets, and the stars. However, Aristotle believed that while the planets rotate, the stars still remain fixed. His argument was that if such a massive body was moving, there must surely be evidence that is noticeable from the Earth. However, one cannot hear the stars moving, nor can they really see their progress, so Aristotle concludes that while they may be shifted by the planets, they do not move themselves. He writes in On the Heavens, "If the bodies of the stars moved in a quantity either of air or of fire...the noise which they created would inevitably be tremendous, and this being so, it would reach and shatter things here on earth". His theory that the stars may be carried but were fixed and do not autonomously move or rotate was widely accepted for a time.

=== Aristarchus of Samos ===
Aristarchus (3rd cent. BC), proposed an early heliocentric universe, which would later inspire the work of Copernicus. In his model, the Sun, entirely stationary, lay at the center, and all planets revolved around it. Beyond the planets was the sphere of fixed stars, also motionless. This system presented two more unique ideas in addition to being heliocentric: the Earth rotated daily to create day, night, and the perceived motions of the other heavenly bodies, and the sphere of fixed stars at its boundary were immensely distant from its center. This massive distance had to be assumed due to the fact that stars were observed to have no parallax, which can only be explained by geocentricity or immense distances which create a parallax too small to be measured.

=== Claudius Ptolemy ===
Ptolemy, 100–175 AD, summarized ideas about the cosmos through his mathematical models and his book Mathematical Syntaxis, much more commonly known as the Almagest. It was written around 150 AD, and Ptolemy declared that the stars' placement in relation to each other and distances apart remained unchanged by the rotation of the heavens. He utilized a method using eclipses to find the star distances and calculated the distance of the Moon based on parallax observations. Shortly after, he wrote a follow-up called Planetary Hypotheses.

Ptolemy used and wrote about the geocentric system, drawing greatly on traditional Aristotelian physics, but using more complicated devices, known as deferent and epicycles he borrowed from previous works by geometer Apollonius of Perga and astronomer Hipparchus of Nicaea. He declared that the stars are fixed within their celestial spheres, but the spheres themselves are not fixed. The rotations of these spheres thus explain the subtle movements of the constellations throughout the year.

=== Martianus Capella ===
Martianus Capella (fl. c. 410–420) describes a modified geocentric model, in which the Earth is at rest in the center of the universe and circled by the Moon, the Sun, three planets and the stars, while Mercury and Venus circle the Sun, all surrounded by the sphere of fixed stars. His model was not widely accepted, despite his authority; he was one of the earliest developers of the system of the seven liberal arts, the trivium (grammar, logic, and rhetoric) and the quadrivium (arithmetic, geometry, music, astronomy), that structured early medieval education. Nonetheless, his single encyclopedic work, De nuptiis Philologiae et Mercurii ("On the Marriage of Philology and Mercury"), also called De septem disciplinis ("On the seven disciplines") was read, taught, and commented upon throughout the early Middle Ages and shaped European education during the early medieval period and the Carolingian Renaissance.

=== Nicolaus Copernicus ===
Nicolaus Copernicus (1473–1543) created a heliocentric system composed of orbs carrying each of the heavenly bodies. The final orb in his model was that of the fixed stars. This final orb was the largest of his cosmos, in both diameter and thickness. This orb of stars is entirely fixed, as the stars are embedded in the sphere, and the sphere itself is immobile. The perceived motion of the stars, therefore, is created by the daily rotation of the Earth about its axis.

=== Tycho Brahe ===
Tycho Brahe's (1546–1601) system of the universe has been called "geo-heliocentric" due to its twofold structure. At its center lies the stationary Earth, which is orbited by the Moon and Sun. The planets then revolve about the Sun while it revolves about the Earth. Beyond all of these heavenly bodies lies a sphere of fixed stars. This sphere rotates about the stationary Earth, creating the perceived motion of the stars in the sky. This system has an interesting feature in that the Sun and planets cannot be contained in solid orbs (their orbs would collide), but yet the stars are represented as being contained in a fixed sphere at the boundary of the cosmos.

=== Johannes Kepler ===
Johannes Kepler (1571–1630) was a devoted Copernican, following Copernicus's models and ideas yet developing them. He was also an assistant of Tycho Brahe, and he could access his patron's accurate measurements in his observational database. Kepler's Mysterium cosmographicum (1596), a strong defense of the Copernican system, still pictures an image labelling the outmost celestial sphere as Sphaera Stellar Fixar, Latin for sphere of fixed stars, following the long-held belief in such sphere.

This view was later superseded in his book Astronomia nova (1609), where he established his laws of planetary motion, the mathematical basis for his own Rudolphine Tables, which are working tables from which planetary positions could be shown. Kepler's laws were the tipping point in finally disproving the old geocentric (or Ptolemaic) cosmic theories and models, what was backed by the first uses of telescope by his contemporary Galileo Galilei, also an advocate of Copernicus.

== Estimated radius ==
First Greeks, as many other ancient cultures, thought of sky as it was a giant dome-like structure only a few meters above the highest mountains. The myth of Atlas tells that this Titan held the whole heavens on his shoulders.

Around 560 BC, Anaximander was the first to present a system where the celestial bodies turned at different distances. But erroneously, he thought the stars were closer to Earth (about 9 to 10 times the Earth's size) than the Moon (18–19 times) and the Sun (27–28 times). Nonetheless, later Pythagorians as Philolaus around 400 BC, also conceived a universe with orbiting bodies, thus assuming the fixed stars were, at least, a bit farther than the Moon, the Sun and the rest of the planets.

Meanwhile, circa 450 BC Anaxagoras was the first philosopher to consider the Sun as a huge object (larger than the land of Peloponnesus), and consequently, to realize how far from Earth it might be. He had suggested that the Moon is rocky, thus opaque, and closer to the Earth than the Sun, giving a correct explanation of eclipses. As far as the Sun and the Moon were conceived as spherical bodies, and as they do not collide at solar eclipses, this implies than the outer space should have some certain, indeterminate, depth.

Eudoxus of Cnidus, in around 380 BC, devised a geometric-mathematical model for the movements of the planets based on (conceptual) concentric spheres centered on Earth, and by 360 BC Plato claimed in his Timaeus that circles and spheres were the preferred shape of the universe, and that the Earth was at the centre and the stars forming the outermost shell, followed by planets, the Sun, and the Moon.

Around 350 BC Aristotle modified Eudoxus' model by supposing the spheres were material and crystalline. He was able to articulate the spheres for most planets, however, the spheres for Jupiter and Saturn crossed each other. Aristotle solved this complication by introducing an unrolled sphere. By all these devices, and even assuming the planets were star-like, single points, the sphere of the fixed stars should implicitly be farther than previously thought.

Around 280 BC, Aristarchus of Samos offered the first definite discussion of the possibility of a heliocentric cosmos, and by geometrical means he estimated the Moon's orbital radius at 60 Earth radii, and its physical radius as one-third that of the Earth. He made an inaccurate attempt to measure the distance to the Sun, but sufficient to assert that the Sun is much bigger than Earth and it is much further away than the Moon. So the minor body, the Earth, must orbit the major one, the Sun, and not the opposite. This reasoning led him to assert that, as stars do not show evident parallax viewed from Earth along a single year, they must be very, very far away from the terrestrial surface and, assuming they were all at the same distance from us, he gave a relative estimation.

Following the heliocentric ideas of Aristarcus (but not explicitly supporting them), around 250 BC Archimedes in his work The Sand Reckoner computes the diameter of the universe centered around the Sun to be about 10×10^{14} stadia (in modern units, about 2 light years, 18.93×10^{12} km, 11.76×10^{12} mi).

In Archimedes' own words:

His [Aristarchus'] hypotheses are that the fixed stars and the Sun remain unmoved, that the Earth revolves about the Sun on the circumference of a circle, the Sun lying in the middle of the orbit, and that the sphere of fixed stars, situated about the same center as the Sun, is so great that the circle in which he supposes the Earth to revolve bears such a proportion to the distance of the fixed stars as the center of the sphere bears to its surface.

Around 210 BC, Apollonius of Perga shows the equivalence of two descriptions of the apparent retrograde motions of planets (assuming the geocentric model): one using eccentrics and another deferent and epicycles.

In the following century, measures of the sizes and distances of the Earth and the Moon improved. Around 200 BC Eratosthenes determined that the radius of the Earth is roughly 6,400 km (4,000 mi). Circa 150 BC Hipparchus used parallax to determine that the distance to the Moon is roughly 380,000 km (236,100 mi), nearly matching Aristarchus. This imposed a minimum radius for the sphere of fixed stars at center-to-center Earth to Moon distance plus the Moon's radius (approx. 1/3 Earth radius), plus the width of the Sun (it being, at least, the same that the Moon), plus the indeterminate thickness of the planets' spheres (believed to be thin, anyway), for a total about 386,400 km (240,100 mi). This was around 24,500,000 times lower than Archimedes' computation.

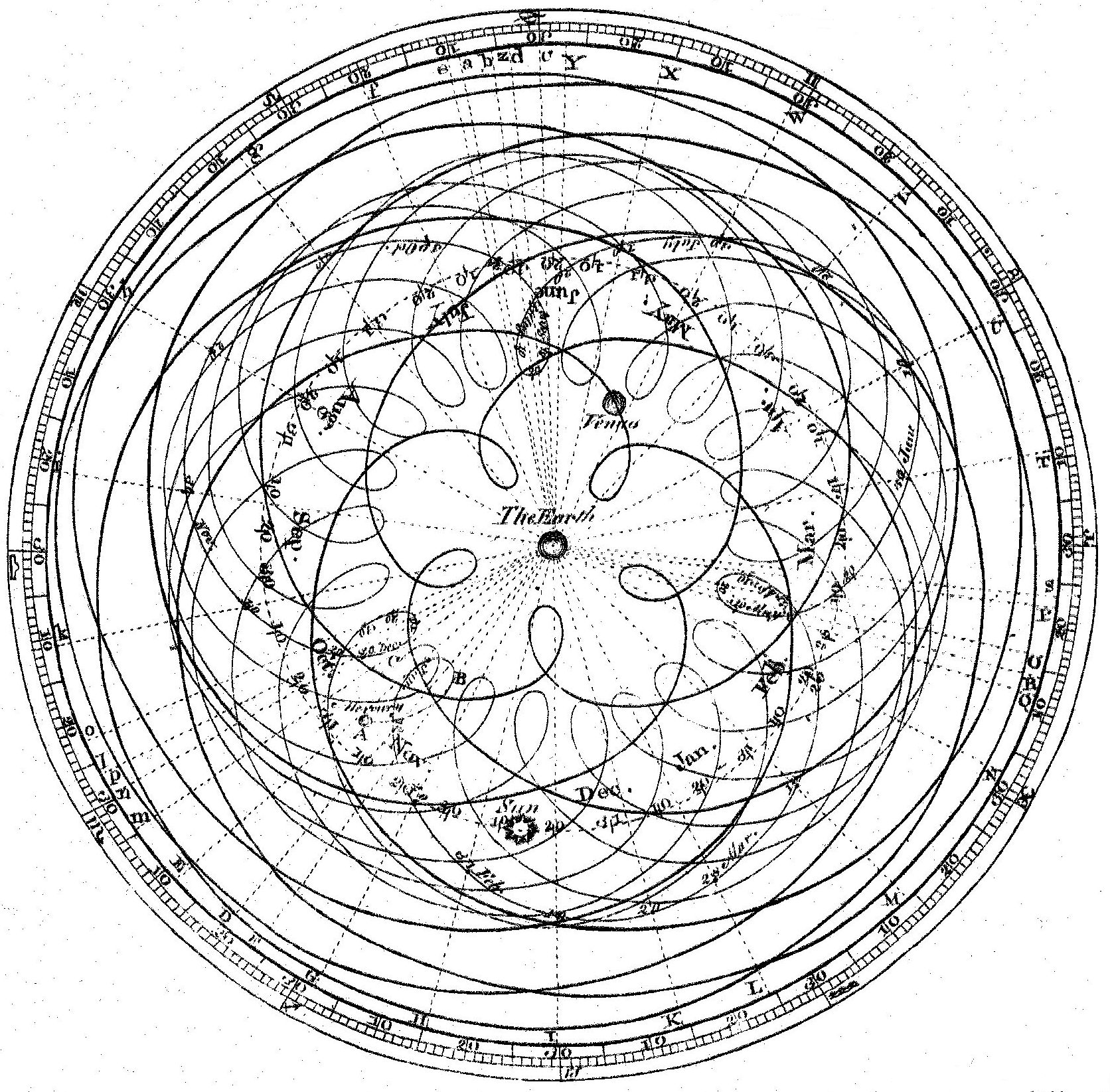
The complexity to be described by the geocentric model

Around 130 AD, Ptolemy adopted Apollonius' epicycles in his geocentric model. Epicycles are described as an orbit within an orbit. For example, looking at Venus, Ptolemy claimed that it orbits the Earth, and as it orbits the Earth, it also orbits the original orbit riding a second, minor local sphere. (Ptolemy emphasised that the epicycle motion does not apply to the Sun.) This device necessarily enlarges each of the celestial spheres, thus making the outer sphere of the fixed stars yet larger.

When scholars applied Ptolemy's epicycles, they presumed that each planetary sphere was exactly thick enough to accommodate them. By combining this nested sphere model with astronomical observations, scholars calculated what became generally accepted values at the time for the distances to the Sun: about 4 million kilometres (2.5 million miles), and to the edge of the universe: about 73 million kilometres (45 million miles), still around 130,000 times less than Archimedes.

Ptolemy's methods, written in his Almagest, were accurate enough to keep them largely undisputed for more than 1,500 years. But by the European Renaissance, the possibility that such a huge sphere could complete a single revolution of 360° around the Earth in only 24 hours was deemed improbable, and this point was one of the arguments of Nicholas Copernicus for leaving behind the centuries-old geocentric model.

The highest upper bound ever given was by Jewish astronomer Levi ben Gershon (Gersonides) who, circa 1300, estimated the distance to the fixed stars to be no less than 159,651,513,380,944 Earth radii, or about 100,000 light-years in modern units. This was an overestimate; although in the actual universe there are stars farther than that distance, both in the Milky Way (about three times wider) and all the external galaxies, the closest star from Earth (other than the Sun) is Proxima Centauri at about 4.25 light-years only.

== In other cultures ==
=== In Nordic mythology ===
The attempts to explain the universe stem from observations of the objects found in the sky. Different cultures historically have various stories to provide an answer to the questions of what they are seeing. Norse mythology originates from northern Europe, around the geographical location of modern-day region of Scandinavia and northern Germany. The Norse mythology consists of tales and myths derived from Old Norse, which was a Northern German language from the Middle Ages. There is a series of manuscript texts written in Old Norse which contain a collection of [35] poems written from oral tradition. Among historians there seems to be speculation of the specific dates of the poems written, however, the estimated record of the texts is around the beginning of the thirteenth century. Although the oral tradition of passing down tales existed long before the advent of text manuscripts and print versions.

Among surviving texts there is mention of the mythological god, Odin. Scholars have recounted the tale of the Αesir Gods creation myth which includes the idea of fixed stars found within the teleology of the tale. Padaric Colum has written a book, The Children of Odin, which in much detail reiterates the story of how the Aesir gods brought the giant named Ymir to his demise and created the world from his body, affixing sparks from the fiery Muspelheim, or the fixed stars, to the dome of the sky, which was the skull of Ymir. The Norse creation myth is one of several cases which treated stars as being fixed to a sphere beyond the earth. Later scientific literature shows astronomical thought which kept a version of this idea until the seventeenth century.

== Developing western astronomy ==
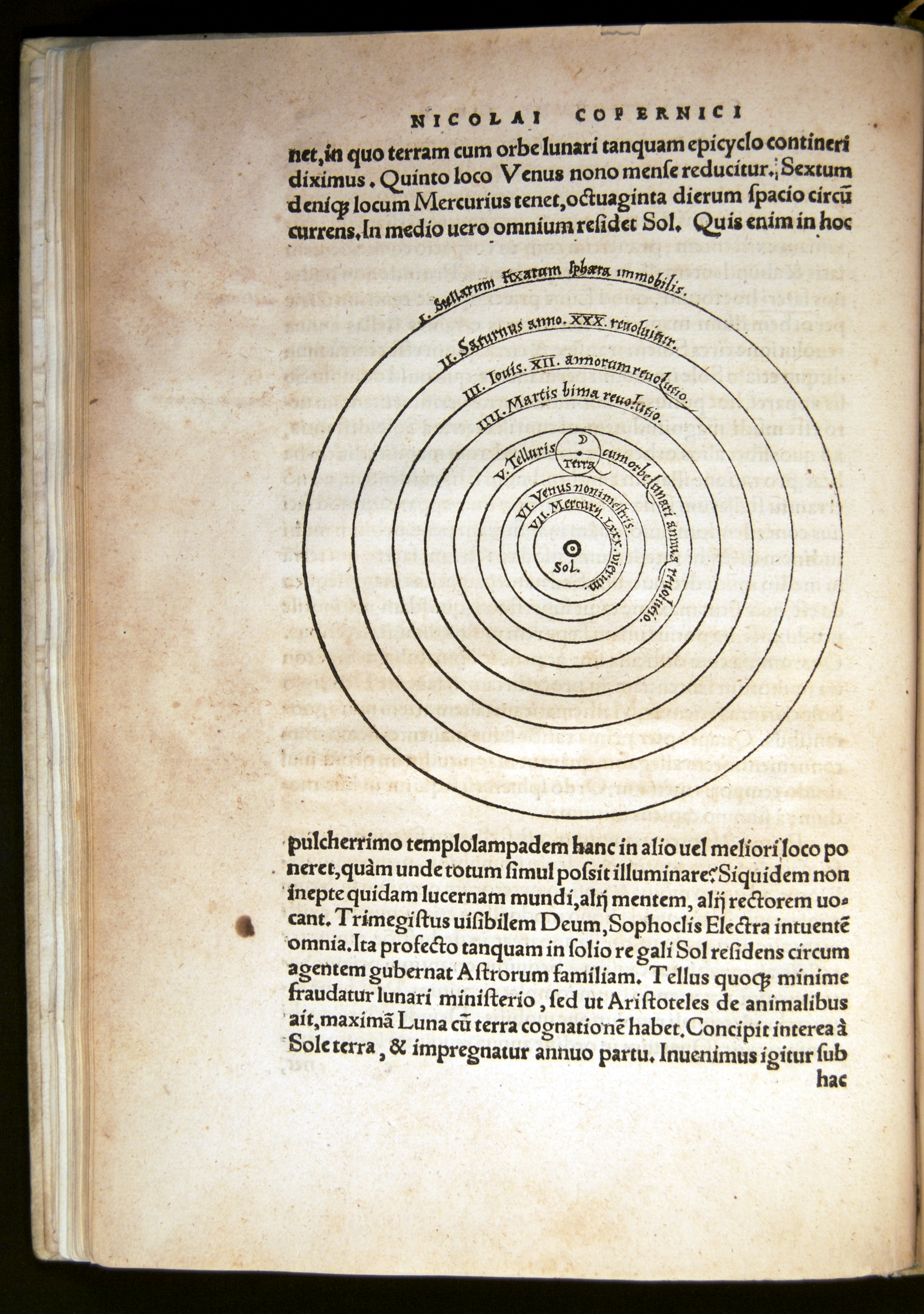
Copernicus, Nicolaus. On the Revolutions of the Heavenly Spheres. Nüremberg. 1543. Print copy of Copernicus's work showing the model of the universe with the Sun in the center and a sphere of "immobile stars" on the outside according to his theory of the cosmos.

Western astronomical knowledge was based on the traditional thoughts from philosophical and observational inquiries of Greek Antiquity. Other cultures contributed to thought about the fixed stars including the Babylonians, who from the eighteenth to the sixth century BC constructed constellation maps. Maps of the stars and the idea of mythological stories to explain them were largely being acquired all over the world and in several cultures. One similarity between them all was the preliminary understanding that the stars were fixed and immobile in the universe.

This understanding was incorporated into theorized models and mathematical representations of the cosmos by philosophers like Anaximander and Aristotle from the Ancient Greeks. Anaximander proposed this original (and erroneous) order of the celestial objects above the Earth: first a nearest layer with the fixed stars plus planets, then another layer with the Moon, and finally an outer one with the Sun. To him, the stars, as well as the Sun and Moon, were apertures of "wheel-like condensations filled with fire". All other later models of the planetary system show a celestial sphere containing fixed stars on the outermost part of the universe, its edge, within it lie all the rest of the moving luminaires.

Plato, Aristotle and other like Greek thinkers of antiquity, and later the Ptolemaic model of the cosmos showed an Earth-centered universe. Ptolemy was influential with his heavily mathematical work, the Almagest, which attempts to explain the peculiarity of stars that moved. These "wandering stars", planets, moved across the background of fixed stars which were spread along a sphere surrounding encompassing the universe. This geocentric view was held through the Middle Ages, and was later countered by subsequent astronomers and mathematicians alike, such as Nicolaus Copernicus and Johannes Kepler, who challenged the long-standing view of geocentrism and constructed a Sun-centered universe, this being known as the heliocentric system. The tradition of thought which appears in all of these systems of the universe, even with their divergent mechanisms, is the presence of the sphere of fixed stars.

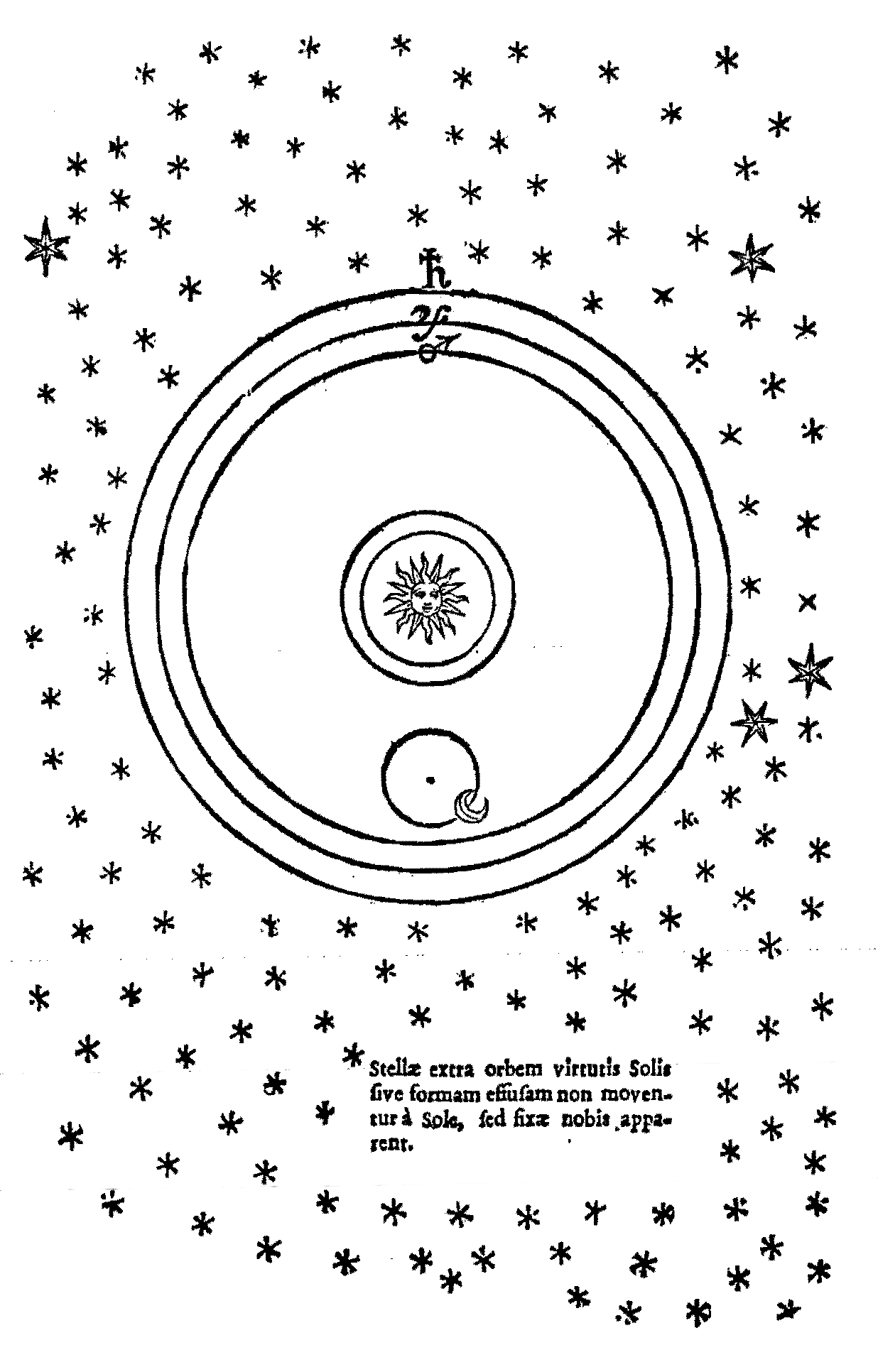
The heliocentric universe appearing in De Mundo Nostro Sublunari Philosophia Nova (New Philosophy about our Sublunary World), attributed to William Gilbert, 1631 (posthumous). The text reads: "The stars outside the orb of the Sun's power, or in the form of an effusion, are not moved by the Sun, but appear fixed to us."

In the sixteenth century, a number of writers inspired by Copernicus, such as Thomas Digges, Giordano Bruno and William Gilbert argued for an indefinitely extended or even infinite universe, with other stars as distant suns, paving the way to deprecate the Aristotelian sphere of the fixed stars. (This was a revival of beliefs held by Democritus, Epicurus, and Fakhr al-Din al-Razi).

The studies of the heavens were revolutionized with the invention of the telescope. First developed in 1608, Galileo Galilei heard about it and made a telescope for himself. He immediately noticed that the planets were not, in fact, perfectly smooth, a theory formerly put forth by Aristotle. He continued to examine the skies and constellations and soon knew that the "fixed stars" which had been studied and mapped were only a tiny portion of the massive universe that lay beyond the reach of the naked eye. When in 1610 he aimed his telescope to the faint strip of the Milky Way, he found it resolves into countless white star-like spots, presumably farther stars themselves.

The development of Isaac Newton's laws, published in his work Philosophiæ Naturalis Principia Mathematica in 1687, raised further questions among theorists about the mechanisms of the heavens: the universal force of gravity suggested that stars could not simply be fixed or at rest, as their gravitational pulls cause "mutual attraction" and therefore cause them to move in relation to each other.

The term "Solar System" entered the English language by 1704, when John Locke used it to refer to the Sun, planets, and comets as a whole. By then it had been established beyond doubt, thanks to increased telescopic observations plus Keplerian and Newtonian celestial mechanics, that planets are other worlds, and stars are other distant suns, so the whole Solar System is actually only a small part of an immensely large universe, and definitively something distinct.

== "Fixed stars" not fixed ==
Principle of the stellar parallax effect, and the definition of one parsec as a unit of distance (not to scale).

Relation between proper motion and velocity components of a distant, moving celestial object as seen from the Solar System (not to scale).

Doppler redshift and blueshift

Astronomers and natural philosophers before divided the lights in the sky into two groups. One group contained the fixed stars, which appear to rise and set but keep the same relative arrangement over time, and show no evident stellar parallax, which is a change in apparent position caused by the orbital motion of the Earth. The other group contained the naked eye planets, which they called wandering stars. (The Sun and Moon were sometimes called stars and planets as well.) The planets seem to move forward and back, changing their position over short periods of time (weeks or months). They always seem to move within the band of stars called the zodiac by Westerners. The planets can also be distinguished from fixed stars because stars tend to twinkle, while planets appear to shine with a steady light.

However, fixed stars show parallax. It can be used to find the distance to nearby stars. This motion is only apparent; it is the Earth that moves. This effect was small enough not to be accurately measured until the 19th century, but from about 1670 and onward, astronomers such as Jean Picard, Robert Hooke, John Flamsteed, and others began detecting motion from the stars and attempting measurements. These movements amounted to significant, if almost imperceptibly small, fractions. The first successful stellar parallax measurements were done by Thomas Henderson in Cape Town, South Africa from 1832 to 1833, where he measured the parallax of and distance to one of the closest stars ― Alpha Centauri. Henderson did not publish these observations until 1839, after Friedrich Wilhelm Bessel published his parallax observations and distance estimate to 61 Cygni in 1838.

The fixed stars exhibit real motion as well, however. This motion may be viewed as having components that consist in part of motion of the galaxy to which the star belongs, in part of rotation of that galaxy, and in part of motion peculiar to the star itself within its galaxy. In the case of star systems or star clusters, the individual components even move with respect to each other in a non-linear manner.

Relative to the Solar System, this real motion of a star is divided into radial motion and proper motion, with "proper motion" being the component across the line of sight. In 1718 Edmund Halley announced his discovery that the fixed stars actually have proper motion. Proper motion was not noticed by ancient cultures because it requires precise measurements over long periods of time to notice. In fact, the night sky today looks very much as it did thousands of years ago, so much so that some modern constellations were first named by the Babylonians.

A typical method to determine proper motion is to measure the position of a star relative to a limited, selected set of very distant objects that exhibit no mutual movement, and that, because of their distance, are assumed to have very small proper motion. Another approach is to compare photographs of a star at different times against a large background of more distant objects. The star with the largest known proper motion is Barnard's Star.

Radial velocity of stars, and other deep-space objects, can be revealed spectroscopically thru the Doppler-Fizeau effect, by which the frequency of the received light decreases for objects that were receding (redshift) and increases for objects that were approaching (blueshift), when compared to the light emitted by a stationary object. William Huggins ventured in 1868 to estimate the radial velocity of Sirius with respect to the Sun, based on observed redshift of the star's light.

The phrase "fixed star" is technically incorrect, but nonetheless it is used in an historical context, and in classical mechanics. When used as a visual reference for observations, they usually are called background stars or simply distant stars, still retaining the intuitive meaning of they being "fixed" in some practical sense.

== In classical mechanics ==
In Newton's time the fixed stars were invoked as a reference frame supposedly at rest relative to absolute space. In other reference frames either at rest with respect to the fixed stars or in uniform translation relative to these stars, Newton's laws of motion were supposed to hold. In contrast, in frames accelerating with respect to the fixed stars, in particular frames rotating relative to the fixed stars, the laws of motion did not hold in their simplest form, but had to be supplemented by the addition of fictitious forces, for example, the Coriolis force and the centrifugal force.

As we now know, the fixed stars are not fixed. The concept of inertial frames of reference is no longer tied to either the fixed stars or to absolute space. Rather, the identification of an inertial frame is based upon the simplicity of the laws of physics in the frame, in particular, the absence of fictitious forces.

Law of inertia holds for Galilean coordinate system which is a hypothetical system relative to which fixed stars remain fixed.

== Literary references ==
- Dante made the fixed stars the eighth of the ten heavens into which he divided his Paradiso.

== See also ==
- Celestial sphere
- Astronomical coordinate systems
- Celestial navigation
- Star catalogue
  - Catalogues of Fundamental Stars
  - Guide Star Catalog
- List of stars for navigation
- Pole star
- Guide star
- Star tracker
- Fine guidance sensor
- Apparent magnitude (Related to apparent brightness)
- Firmament
- Behenian fixed star
- Historical models of the Solar System
- Dynamics of the celestial spheres
- Milky Way
