= Phanto =

Phanto may refer to:

- Phanto, a Mario franchise character which first appeared in the video game Yume Kōjō: Doki Doki Panic
- Phanto of Phlius, a 4th-century BC Pythagorean philosopher
- "She-Demon of Phantos", an episode of the American animated television series He-Man and the Masters of the Universe
