= Pythagorean astronomical system =

Hypothesized astronomical system

An astronomical system positing that the Earth, Moon, Sun, and planets revolve around an unseen "Central Fire" was developed in the fifth century BC and has been attributed to the Pythagorean philosopher Philolaus. The system has been called "the first coherent system in which celestial bodies move in circles", anticipating Copernicus in moving "the earth from the center of the cosmos [and] making it a planet". Although its concepts of a Central Fire distinct from the Sun, and a nonexistent "Counter-Earth" were erroneous, the system contained the insight that "the apparent motion of the heavenly bodies" was (in large part) due to "the real motion of the observer". How much of the system was intended to explain observed phenomena and how much was based on myth, mysticism, and religion is disputed. While the departure from traditional reasoning is impressive, other than the inclusion of the five visible planets, very little of the Pythagorean system is based on genuine observation. In retrospect, Philolaus's views are "less like scientific astronomy than like symbolical speculation."

Philolaus believed there was a "Counter-Earth" (Antichthon) orbiting the "Central Fire" (pyr méson) and that neither were visible from Earth. The upper illustration depicts Earth at night while the lower one depicts Earth in the day.

== Before Philolaus ==
Knowledge of contributions to Pythagorean astronomy before Philolaus is limited. Hippasus, another early Pythagorean philosopher, did not contribute to astronomy, and no evidence of Pythagoras's work on astronomy remains. None for the remaining astronomical contributions can be attributed to a single person and, therefore, Pythagoreans as whole take the credit. However, it should not be presumed that the Pythagoreans as a unanimous group agreed on a single system before the time of Philolaus.

One surviving theory from the Pythagoreans before Philolaus, the harmony of the spheres, is first mentioned in Plato’s Republic. Plato presents the theory in a mythological sense by including it in the Myth of Er, which concludes the Republic. Aristotle mentions the theory in De Caelo, in which he presents the theory as a "physical doctrine" that coincides with the rest of the Pythagorean cosmology, rather than attributing it to myth.

Zhmud summarizes the theory thus:

1) the circular motion of the celestial bodies produces a sound; 2) the loudness of the sound is proportional to their speed and magnitude (according to Achytas, the loudness and pitch of the sound depends on the force with which it is produced; 3) the velocities of the celestial bodies, being proportional to their distances from the earth, have the ratios of concords; 4) hence the planets and stars produce harmonious sounds; 5) we cannot hear this harmonious sound.

— Zhmudʹ, L. I͡a. Pythagoras and the Early Pythagoreans. p. 340.

== Philolaus ==
Philolaus (c. 470 to c. 385 BC) was a follower of the pre-Socratic Greek philosopher Pythagoras of Samos. Pythagoras developed a school of philosophy that was both dominated by mathematics and "profoundly mystical". Philolaus has been called one of "the three most prominent figures in the Pythagorean tradition" and "the outstanding figure in the Pythagorean school", who may have been the first "to commit Pythagorean doctrine to writing". Most of what is known today about the Pythagorean astronomical system is derived from Philolaus's views. Because of questions about the reliability of ancient non-primary documents, scholars are not absolutely certain that Philolaus developed the astronomical system based on the Central Fire, but they do believe that either he, or someone else in the late fifth century BC, created it. Another issue with attributing the whole of Pythagorean astronomy to Philolaus is that he may have had teachers who were associated with other schools of thought.

== The system ==
In the Pythagorean view, the universe is an ordered unit. Beginning from the middle, the universe expands outward around a central point, implying a spherical nature. In Philolaus’s view, for the universe to be formed, the "limiters" and "unlimited" must harmonize and be fitted together. Unlimited units are defined as continuous elements, such as water, air, or fire. Limiters, such as shapes and forms, are defined as things that set limits in a continuum. Philolaus believed that universal harmony was achieved in the Central Fire, where the combination of an unlimited unit, fire, and the central limit formed the cosmos. It is presumed as such because fire is the "most precious" of elements, and the center is a place of honor. Therefore, there must be fire at the center of the cosmos. According to Philolaus, the central fire and cosmos are surrounded by an unlimited expanse. Three unlimited elements: time, breath, and void, were drawn in toward the central fire, where the interaction between fire and breath created the elements of earth and water. Additionally, Philolaus reasoned that separated pieces of the Central Fire may have created the heavenly bodies.

In Philolaus's system, these heavenly bodies, namely the earth and planets, revolved around a central point. This could not be called a Heliocentric "solar system", because in his concept, the central point that the earth and planets revolved around was not the sun, but the so-called Central Fire. He postulated that this Central Fire was not visible from the surface of Earth—at least not from Greece.

Philolaus says that there is fire in the middle at the centre ... and again more fire at the highest point and surrounding everything. By nature the middle is first, and around it dance ten divine bodies—the sky, the planets, then the sun, next the moon, next the earth, next the counterearth, and after all of them the fire of the hearth which holds position at the centre. The highest part of the surrounding, where the elements are found in their purity, he calls Olympus; the regions beneath the orbit of Olympus, where are the five planets with the sun and the moon, he calls the world; the part under them, being beneath the moon and around the earth, in which are found generation and change, he calls the sky.

— Stobaeus, i. 22. 1d

However, it has been pointed out that Stobaeus betrays a tendency to confound the dogmas of the early Ionian philosophers, and occasionally mixes up Platonism with Pythagoreanism.

According to Eudemus, a pupil of Aristotle, the early Pythagoreans were the first to find the order of the planets visible to the naked eye. While Eudemus doesn’t provide the order, it is presumed to be moon – sun – Venus – Mercury – Mars – Jupiter – Saturn – celestial sphere, based on the mystically "correct" order accepted in the time of Eudemus. It is likely that the Pythagoreans mentioned by Eudemus predate Philolaus.

In this system the revolution of the earth around the fire "at the centre" or "the fire of the hearth" (Central Fire) was not yearly, but daily, while the moon's revolution was monthly, and the sun's yearly. It was postulated that the earth's speedy travel past the slower moving sun resulted in the appearance on earth of the sun rising and setting. Farther from the Central Fire, the revolution of the planets was slower still, and the outermost "sky" (i.e. stars) probably fixed.

== Central Fire ==
The Central Fire (πῦρ μέσον—pŷr méson) defines the center-most limit in the Pythagorean astronomical system. It is around this point that all heavenly bodies were said to rotate. Wrongly translated as “Prison of Zeus,” (Διός φυλακή—Dios phylakê) or a sort of hell, the Central Fire was more appropriately called "Watch-tower of Zeus" (Διός πυργός—Dios pyrgós) or "Hearth-altar of the universe." (ἑστία τοῦ παντός—Estía toú pantós) Maniatis claims that these translations more accurately reflect Philolaus's thoughts on the Central Fire. Its comparison to a hearth, the "religious center of the house and the state", shows its proper role as "the palace where Zeus guarded his sacred fire in the center of the cosmos".

Rather than there being two separate fiery heavenly bodies in this system, Philolaus may have believed that the Sun was a mirror, reflecting the heat and light of the Central Fire. Johannes Kepler, a sixteenth–seventeenth century European thinker, believed that Philolaus's Central Fire was the sun, but that the Pythagoreans felt the need to hide that teaching from non-believers.

== Earth ==
In Philolaus's system, the earth rotated exactly once per orbit, with one hemisphere (presumed to be the unknown side of the Earth) always facing the Central Fire. The Counter-Earth and the Central Fire were thus never visible from the hemisphere where Greece was located. There is "no explicit statement about the shape of the earth in Philolaus' system", so that he may have believed either that the earth was flat or that it was round and orbited the Central Fire as the Moon orbits Earth—always with one hemisphere facing the Fire and one facing away. A flat Earth facing away from the Central Fire would be consistent with the pre-gravity concept that if all things must fall toward the center of the universe, this force would allow the earth to revolve around the center without spilling everything on the surface into space. Others maintain that by 500 BC most contemporary Greek philosophers considered the Earth to be spherical.

== Counter-Earth ==
The "mysterious" Counter-Earth (Ἀντίχθων/Antichthon) was the other celestial body not visible from Earth. We know that Aristotle described it as "another Earth", from which Greek scholar George Burch infers that it must be similar in size, shape, and constitution to Earth. According to Aristotle—a critic of the Pythagoreans—the function of the Counter-Earth was to explain "eclipses of the moon and their frequency", and/or "to raise the number of heavenly bodies around the Central Fire from nine to ten, which the Pythagoreans regarded as the perfect number".

Some, such as astronomer John Louis Emil Dreyer, have thought that the Counter-Earth followed an orbit such that it was always located between Earth and the Central Fire, but Burch argues it must have been thought to orbit on the other side of the Fire from Earth. Since "counter" means "opposite", and opposite can only be in respect to the Central Fire, the Counter-Earth must be orbiting 180 degrees from Earth. Burch also argues that Aristotle was simply having a joke "at the expense of Pythagorean number theory" and that the true function of the Counter-Earth was to balance Earth. Balance was needed because without a counter there would be only one dense, massive object in the system—Earth. The universe would be "lopsided and asymmetric—a notion repugnant to any Greek, and doubly so to a Pythagorean", because Ancient Greeks believed all other celestial objects were composed of a fiery or ethereal matter having little or no density.

== See also ==
- Counter-Earth
- Greek astronomy
- Pythagoreanism
- Cosmology § Historical cosmologies
