= Counter-Earth =

Hypothetical planet on the other side of the Sun from Earth

Philolaus believed there was a "Counter-Earth" (Antichthon) orbiting the "Central Fire" (not labeled) that was not visible from Earth. The upper illustration depicts Earth at night while the lower one depicts Earth in the day.

The Counter-Earth is a hypothetical body of the Solar System that orbits on the other side of the Solar System from Earth, e.g. at the L_{3} Lagrange point of the Sun–Earth system. A Counter-Earth, or Antichthon (Greek: Ἀντίχθων), was hypothesized by the pre-Socratic Greek philosopher Philolaus (c. 470 – c. 385 BC) to support his non-geocentric cosmology, in which all objects in the universe revolve around a Central Fire (πῦρ μέσον, pŷr méson) unseen from Earth and distinct from the Sun which also revolves around it.

In modern times, a hypothetical planet always on the other side of the Sun from Earth has been called a Counter-Earth, and has been a recurring theme in UFO claims, as well as in fiction (particularly science fiction).

== Greek Pythagorean universe ==
An astronomical system positing that the Earth, Moon, Sun, planets and unseen "counter-earth" revolve around an unseen "Central Fire" (pŷr méson) was developed in the 5th century BC and attributed to the Pythagorean philosopher Philolaus. Philolaus' universe moved "the earth from the center of the cosmos", and provided the insight that "the apparent motion of the heavenly bodies" was (in large part) due to "the real motion of the observer"—i.e. Earth.

In Philolaus' system, the Earth and Counter-Earth revolved around the unseen Central Fire every 24 hours, while the Moon's revolution was monthly, and the Sun's yearly. It was the Earth's speedy travel past the slower moving Sun that resulted in the appearance on Earth of the Sun rising and setting. Further from the Central Fire, the Planets' movement was slower still, and the outermost "sky" (i.e. stars) probably fixed.

=== Counter-Earth ===
Along with the Central Fire, the "mysterious" Counter-Earth (Antichthon) was the other heavenly body not visible from Earth. Aristotle described it as "another Earth", from which Greek scholar George Burch infers that it must be similar in size, shape and constitution to Earth. Some (such as astronomer John Louis Emil Dreyer) have thought that Philolaus had it following an orbit such that it was always located between Earth and the Central Fire. However, Burch argues that Philolaus must have thought that it orbited on the other side of the Fire from Earth. Since "counter" means "opposite", and opposite could only be in respect to the Central Fire, it follows that the Counter-Earth must be orbiting 180 degrees from Earth.

According to Aristotle—a critic of the Pythagoreans—the function of the Counter-Earth was to explain "eclipses of the moon and their frequency", which could not be explained by Earth alone blocking the light of the Sun if Earth did not revolve around the Sun. Aristotle suggested that it was also introduced "to raise the number of heavenly bodies around the central fire from nine to ten, which the Pythagoreans regarded as the perfect number".

However, Burch believes that Aristotle was having a joke "at the expense of Pythagorean number theory", and that the true purpose of the Counter-Earth was to "balance" Philolaus' cosmos—balance being needed because without a counter there would be only one dense, massive object in the system—Earth. Although his system had both the Earth and the Planets orbiting a single point, the ancient Greeks did not consider Earth a "planet". In the time before Galileo could observe from his telescope that planets were spheres like Earth, they were thought to be different from stars only in brightness and in their motion, and like stars composed of a fiery or ethereal matter having little or no density. However, the Earth was obviously made of the dense elements of earth and water. According to Burch,

If there was a single Earth revolving at some distance from the center of space, then the universe's center of gravity, located in the Earth as its only dense body, would not coincide with its spatial center ... The universe, consequently, would be off center, so to speak—lopsided and asymmetric—a notion repugnant to any Greek, and doubly so to a Pythagorean.

This could be corrected by another body with the same mass as Earth, orbiting the same central point but 180 degrees from Earth—the Counter-Earth.

=== Later ===
In the 1st century AD, after the idea of a spherical Earth had gained more general acceptance, Pomponius Mela, a Latin cosmographer, developed an updated version of the idea, wherein a spherical Earth must have a more or less balanced distribution of land and water, even though all known continents were in the northern hemisphere. Mela drew a map which postulated a continental landmass in the unknown, southern half of Earth—the antipodes—below the equator and the tropics, climes which he believed uninhabitable and impassably hot. Mela ascribed the name "Antichthones" to the inhabitants of this continent.

== Modern era ==
Diagram of modern conception of the Counter-Earth, a planet in the same orbit as the Earth, but 180° out of phase

Philolaus's ideas were all eventually superseded by the modern realization that a spherical Earth rotating on its own axis was one of several spherical planets following the laws of gravity and revolving around a much larger Sun. The idea of a Counter-Earth waned after the heliocentric model of the solar system became widely accepted from the 16th century. In the contemporary world, "Counter-Earth" usually refers to a hypothetical planet with an orbit as Burch described, on the other side of the "Central Fire"—i.e. the Sun. It cannot be seen from Earth, not because Earth faces away from the center, (Note: Pythagoreans are thought to have believed that humans inhabited the side of earth facing away from the Central Fire and Counter Earth.) but because the Sun's great size blocks its view. It has been a recurring motif in fiction—often serving as an allegory for the real Earth—and UFO claims. The 1968 Scientific Study of Unidentified Flying Objects headed by Edward Condon at the University of Colorado even included a "Numerical Experiment on the Possible Existence of an 'Anti-Earth'" as an appendix.

=== Detectability ===
A contour plot of the effective potential due to gravity and the centrifugal force of a two-body system in a rotating frame of reference. (In the context of this article the two bodies are the Sun—the yellow body—and Earth—the dark body between L1 and L2. The Counter-Earth would exist at L3.) The arrows indicate the gradients of the potential around the five Lagrange points—downhill toward them (red) or away from them (blue). Counterintuitively, the L_{4} and L_{5} points are the high points of the potential. At the points themselves these forces are balanced.

A Counter-Earth could still be detected from the Earth for a number of reasons. Even if the Sun blocked its view from Earth, a Counter-Earth would have gravitational influence (perturbation) upon the other planets, comets and man-made probes of the Solar System. Researchers have detected no such influence, and indeed space probes sent to Venus, Mars and other places could not have successfully flown by or landed on their targets if a Counter-Earth existed, as the navigational calculations for their journeys did not take any putative Counter-Earth into account. Roughly speaking, anything larger than 100 miles (160 km) in diameter should have been detected.

Any planetary-sized body 180 degrees from Earth should also have been visible to some space probes, such as NASA's STEREO coronagraph probes (two spacecraft launched into orbits around the Sun in 2006, one farther ahead of and one behind the Earth's orbit) which would have seen the Counter-Earth during the first half of 2007. The separation of the STEREO spacecraft from Earth would give them a view of the L3 point during the early phase of the mission.

A Counter-Earth would also eventually be visible from Earth because the gravitational forces of the other planets on it would make its own orbit unstable. Venus has 82% of the mass of Earth and would come within 0.3 AU of the location of a Counter-Earth every 20 months, providing considerable gravitational pull that over the years would move its orbit into sight of observers on Earth.

=== In fiction ===
Counter-Earth has made appearances in fiction since the late 19th century. It is variously depicted as very similar to Earth or very different, and often employed as a vehicle for satire. Counter-Earth being inhabited by counterparts of the people of Earth is a recurring theme. Variations on the concept also occasionally appear, including extrasolar equivalents, the Mars equivalent "Counter-Mars", and a planet hidden on the other side of the Moon rather than the Sun.

== See also ==
- Pythagorean astronomical system
- Globus Cassus
- Co-orbital moon
- Fictional planets of the Solar System
- Nemesis (hypothetical star)

== Notes ==
M.Admin. (2014, March 26). The Bizarre Greek Theory About The Solar System. KnowledgeNuts. https://knowledgenuts.com/2014/03/26/the-bizarre-greek-theory-about-the-solar-system/
