= Echecrates of Phlius =

4th-century BC Greek philosopher

Echecrates (Greek: Ἐχεκράτης) was a Pythagorean philosopher from the ancient Greek town of Phlius.

He appears in Plato's Phaedo dialogue as an aid to the plot. He meets Phaedo, the dialogue's namesake, some time after the execution of Socrates, and asks Phaedo to tell him the story of the famed philosopher's last hours. Phaedo's presentation of the story comprises most of the dialogue's remainder, though Echecrates interrupts at times to ask questions relevant to the retold discussion.

Little is known about Echecrates other than what Plato reveals, as he is mentioned in very few works. His status as a Pythagorean, also mentioned by Diogenes Laërtius, and his general concern and respect for Socrates are all that can be discerned of his philosophical beliefs.

An Echecrates is mentioned by Aristoxenus as a student of Philolaus and Eurytus. (p. 166)

== See also ==
- List of speakers in Plato's dialogues
