= Lysis of Taras =

5th-century BC Greek philosopher

Lysis of Taras (/ˈlaɪsɪs/; Greek: Λῦσις; fl. c. 5th-century BC) was a Greek philosopher. His life is obscure. He was said to have been a friend and disciple of Pythagoras. After the persecution of the Pythagoreans at Croton and Metapontum in Magna Graecia he escaped and went to Thebes, where he became the teacher of Epaminondas, by whom he was held in the highest esteem. There are, however, serious chronological difficulties with his being both a disciple of Pythagoras and the teacher of Epaminondas. Some of the commentators and doxographers have failed to distinguish between the two different anti-Pythagorean revolutions: the first one circa 500 BC, when Pythagoras himself died, and the second one fifty years later. This could clarify the source of the chronological incoherence.

Lysis was credited as the actual author of a work which was attributed to Pythagoras himself. Diogenes Laërtius quotes from an undoubtedly spurious letter from Lysis to Hippasus as an authority for some statements concerning Damo.
