= Phanto of Phlius =

4th-century BC Greek philosopher

Phanto (or Phanton, Greek: Φάντων; 4th century BC) of Phlius, was a Pythagorean philosopher, and one of the last of the school until the Neopythagorean revival in the Roman era. He was a disciple of Philolaus and Eurytus, and, probably in his old age, contemporary with Aristoxenus, the Peripatetic philosopher, c. 320 BC.
