= Xenophilus (philosopher) =

4th-century BC Greek philosopher

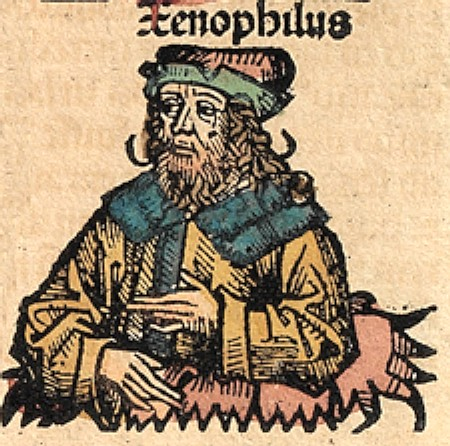
Xenophilus, depicted as a medieval scholar in the Nuremberg Chronicle.

Xenophilus (Greek: Ξενόφιλος; 4th century BC), of Chalcidice, was a Pythagorean philosopher and music theorist who lived in the first half of the 4th century BC. Aulus Gellius relates that Xenophilus was the intimate friend and teacher of Aristoxenus and implies that Xenophilus taught him Pythagorean doctrine. He was said to have belonged to the last generation of Pythagoreans, and he is the only Pythagorean known to have lived in Athens in the 4th century BC.

According to Diogenes Laërtius, Aristoxenus wrote that when Xenophilus was once asked by someone how he could best educate his son, Xenophilus replied, "By making him the citizen of a well-governed state." In the Macrobii of Pseudo-Lucian, Aristoxenus is supposed to have said that Xenophilus lived 105 years. Xenophilus enjoyed considerable fame in the Renaissance, apparently because of Pliny's claim that he lived 105 years without ever being sick.

== Sources ==
- Freeman, Kathleen (1983) [1948]. Ancilla to the Pre-Socratic Philosophers. Cambridge, MA: Harvard University Press. ISBN 0674035011.
- Hahm, David E. (1977). The Origins of Stoic Cosmology. Columbus, OH: Ohio State University Press. hdl:1811/24807. ISBN 0814202535.
- Hayton, Darin (2005). "Joseph Grünpeck's Astrological Explanation of the French Disease". In Siena, Kevin Patrick (ed.). Sins of the Flesh: Responding to Sexual Disease in Early Modern Europe. Toronto: Centre for Reformation and Renaissance Studies. pp. 81–108. ISBN 0772720290.
