= Eurytus (Pythagorean) =

5th-century BC Greek philosopher

Eurytus (/ˈjʊərɪtəs/; Ancient Greek: Εὔρυτος; fl. 400 BC) was an eminent Pythagorean philosopher from Magna Graecia who Iamblichus in one passage describes as a native of Croton, while in another, he enumerates him among the Tarentine Pythagoreans.

== Biography ==
Eurytus was a disciple of Philolaus, and Diogenes Laërtius mentions him among the teachers of Plato, though this statement is very doubtful. It is uncertain whether Eurytus was the author of any work, unless we suppose that the fragment in Stobaeus, which is there ascribed to one Eurytus, belongs to this Eurytus.

Through a dubious commentary to Aristotle's Metaphysics a caricatural image of Eurytus has gained wide currency. A mediaeval writer confused with Alexander of Aphrodisias presented Eurytos as a kind of mosaic-setter who delineated various shapes with some definite number of pebbles.

For example, suppose the number 250 is the definition of human being ... After positing this, he [Eurytus] would take 250 pebbles, some green, some black, others red, and generally pebbles of all colors. Then he smeared a wall with lime and drew a human being in outline ... and then fastened some of these pebbles in the drawn face, others in the hands, others elsewhere, and he completed the drawing of the human being there represented by means of pebbles equal to the units which he declared define human being. As a result of this procedure he would state that just as the particular sketched human being is composed of, say, 250 pebbles, so a real human being is defined by so many units.

Reviel Netz forcefully commented that "pseudo-Alexander’s picture of Eurytus the mosaicist is a non-starter for it is evidently idiotic"and he noted that "while Theophrastus and Aristotle both consider Eurytus’ results patently false, nothing suggests they consider his procedure silly". Taking in account specific mathematical usage he suggested an emended translation of the original passage from Aristotle's work (Metaphysics 1092b9-13):

Are [numbers explanatory or causal] in the sense of definitions, as points are of magnitudes? And [so], as Eurytus assigned a certain number to a certain thing, e.g., this [number] to man, that [number] to horse (just as is done, making numbers into the figures triangle and square), making the forms of living beings analogous, in this way, to calculi (psephoi)?.

According to the historian's from the Stanford Encyclopedia of Philosophy, Philolaus and Eurytus are identified by Aristoxenus as teachers of the last generation of Pythagoreans (D. L. VIII 46). An Echecrates is mentioned by Aristoxenus as a student of Philolaus and Eurytus. (p. 166)
