= Hippasus =

5th-century BC Pythagorean philosopher

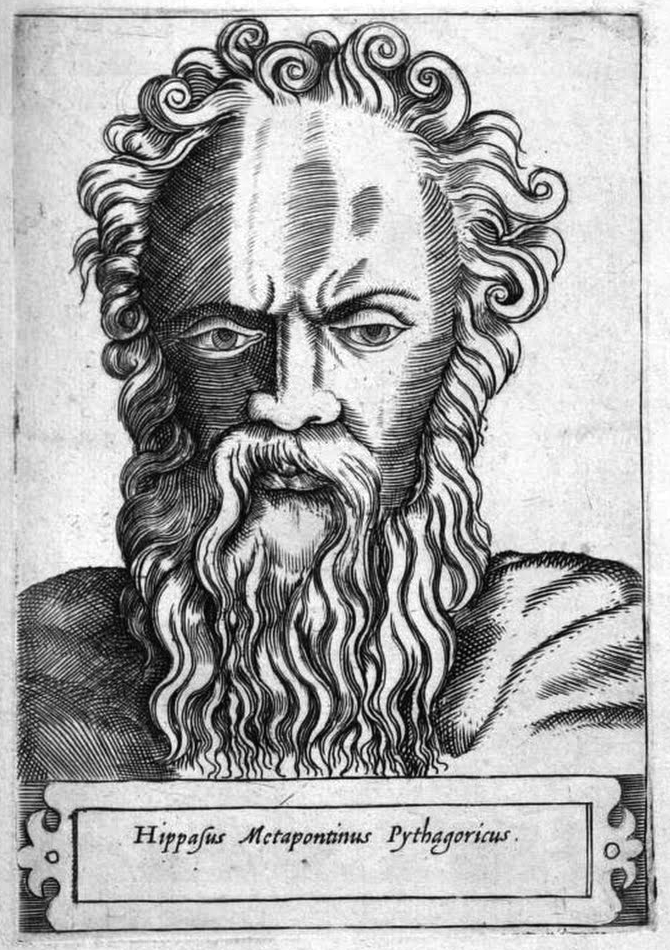
Hippasus, engraving by Girolamo Olgiati, 1580

Hippasus of Metapontum (/ˈhɪpəsəs/; Ancient Greek: Ἵππασος ὁ Μεταποντῖνος, Híppasos; c. 530 – c. 450 BC) was a Greek philosopher and early follower of Pythagoras. Little is known about his life or his beliefs, but he is sometimes credited with the discovery of the existence of irrational numbers. The discovery of irrational numbers is said to have been shocking to the Pythagoreans, and Hippasus is supposed to have drowned at sea, apparently as a punishment from the gods for divulging this and crediting it to himself instead of Pythagoras, which was the norm in Pythagorean society. The few ancient sources who describe this story, however, either do not mention Hippasus by name (e.g., Pappus) or alternatively tell that Hippasus drowned because he revealed how to construct a dodecahedron inside a sphere. The discovery of irrationality is not specifically ascribed to Hippasus by any ancient writer.

== Life ==
Not much is known about the life of Hippasus. He may have lived in the late 5th century BC, about a century after the time of Pythagoras. Metapontum in Magna Graecia is usually referred to as his birthplace, although according to Iamblichus (3rd century AD) some claim Metapontum to be his birthplace, while others the nearby city of Croton. Hippasus is recorded under the city of Sybaris in Iamblichus's list of each city's Pythagoreans. He also states that Hippasus was the founder of a sect of the Pythagoreans called the Mathematici (μαθηματικοί) in opposition to the Acusmatici (ἀκουσματικοί); but elsewhere he makes him the founder of the Acusmatici in opposition to the Mathematici.

Iamblichus says about the death of Hippasus:

It is related to Hippasus that he was a Pythagorean, and that, owing to his being the first to publish and describe the sphere from the twelve pentagons, he perished at sea for his impiety, but he received credit for the discovery, though really it all belonged to HIM (for in this way they refer to Pythagoras, and they do not call him by his name).

According to Iamblichus's The life of Pythagoras,

There were also two forms of philosophy, for the two genera of those that pursued it: the Acusmatici and the Mathematici. The latter are acknowledged to be Pythagoreans by the rest but the Mathematici do not admit that the Acusmatici derived their instructions from Pythagoras but from Hippasus. The philosophy of the Acusmatici consisted in auditions unaccompanied with demonstrations and a reasoning process; because it merely ordered a thing to be done in a certain way and that they should endeavor to preserve such other things as were said by him, as divine dogmas. Memory was the most valued faculty. All these auditions were of three kinds; some signifying what a thing is; others what it especially is, others what ought or ought not to be done. (p. 61)

== Doctrines ==
Aristotle speaks of Hippasus as holding the element of fire to be the cause of all things; and Sextus Empiricus contrasts him with the Pythagoreans in this respect, that he believed the arche to be material, whereas they thought it was incorporeal, namely, number. Diogenes Laërtius tells us that Hippasus believed that "there is a definite time which the changes in the universe take to complete, and that the universe is limited and ever in motion." According to one statement, Hippasus left no writings, according to another he was the author of the Mystic Discourse, written to bring Pythagoras into disrepute.

A scholium on Plato's Phaedo notes him as an early experimenter in music theory, claiming that he made use of bronze disks to discover the fundamental musical ratios, 4:3, 3:2, and 2:1.

=== Irrational numbers ===
Hippasus is sometimes credited with the discovery of the existence of irrational numbers, following which he was drowned at sea. Pythagoreans preached that all numbers could be expressed as the ratio of integers, and the discovery of irrational numbers is said to have shocked them. However, the evidence linking the discovery to Hippasus is unclear.

Pappus (4th century AD) merely says that the knowledge of irrational numbers originated in the Pythagorean school, and that the member who first divulged the secret perished by drowning. Iamblichus (3rd century AD) gives a series of inconsistent reports. In one story he explains how a Pythagorean was merely expelled for divulging the nature of the irrational; but he then cites the legend of the Pythagorean who drowned at sea for making known the construction of the regular dodecahedron in the sphere. In another account he tells how it was Hippasus who drowned at sea for betraying the construction of the dodecahedron and taking credit for this construction himself; but in another story this same punishment is meted out to the Pythagorean who divulged knowledge of the irrational. Iamblichus clearly states that the drowning at sea was a punishment from the gods for impious behaviour.

These stories are usually taken together to ascribe the discovery of irrationals to Hippasus, but whether he did or not is uncertain. In principle, the stories can be combined, since it is possible to discover irrational numbers when constructing dodecahedra. Irrationality, by infinite reciprocal subtraction, can be easily seen in the golden ratio of the regular pentagon.

Some scholars in the early 20th century credited Hippasus with the discovery of the irrationality of $\sqrt2$, the square root of 2. Plato in his Theaetetus, describes how Theodorus of Cyrene (c. 400 BC) proved the irrationality of $\sqrt3$, $\sqrt5$, etc. up to $\sqrt{17}$, which implies that an earlier mathematician had already proved the irrationality of $\sqrt2$. Aristotle referred to the method for a proof of the irrationality of $\sqrt2$, and a full proof along these same lines is set out in the proposition interpolated at the end of Euclid's Book X, which suggests that the proof was certainly ancient. The method is a proof by contradiction, or reductio ad absurdum, which shows that if the diagonal of a square is assumed to be commensurable with the side, then the same number must be both odd and even.

In the hands of modern writers this combination of vague ancient reports and modern guesswork has sometimes evolved into a more emphatic and colourful tale. Some writers have Hippasus making his discovery while on board a ship, as a result of which his Pythagorean shipmates toss him overboard; while one writer even has Pythagoras himself "to his eternal shame" sentencing Hippasus to death by drowning, for showing "that $\sqrt2$ is an irrational number".
