= Classical rhetoric =

Persuasive language in ancient Greece and Rome

Classical rhetoric is the study and art of persuasive language as developed in classical antiquity: the ancient Greco-Roman world.

== Ancient Greece ==
In Europe, organized thought about public speaking began in Ancient Greece.

In Ancient Greece, the earliest mention of oratorical skill occurs in Homer's Iliad, in which heroes like Achilles, Hector, and Odysseus were honored for their ability to advise and exhort their peers and followers (the Laos or army) to wise and appropriate action. With the rise of the democratic polis, speaking skill was adapted to the needs of the public and political life of cities in ancient Greece. Greek citizens used oratory to make political and judicial decisions, and to develop and disseminate philosophical ideas. For modern students, it can be difficult to remember that the wide use and availability of written texts is a phenomenon that was just coming into vogue in Classical Greece. In Classical times, many of the great thinkers and political leaders performed their works before an audience, usually in the context of a competition or contest for fame, political influence, and cultural capital. In fact, many of them are known only through the texts that their students, followers, or detractors wrote down. Rhetor was the Greek term for "orator": A rhetor was a citizen who regularly addressed juries and political assemblies and who was thus understood to have gained some knowledge about public speaking in the process, though in general facility with language was often referred to as logôn techne, "skill with arguments" or "verbal artistry".

Possibly the first study about the power of language may be attributed to the philosopher Empedocles (d. c. 444 BCE), whose theories on human knowledge would provide a basis for many future rhetoricians. The first written manual is attributed to Corax and his pupil Tisias. Their work, as well as that of many of the early rhetoricians, grew out of the courts of law; Tisias, for example, is believed to have written judicial speeches that others delivered in the courts.

Rhetoric evolved as an important art, one that provided the orator with the forms, means, and strategies for persuading an audience of the correctness of the orator's arguments. Today the term rhetoric can be used at times to refer only to the form of argumentation, often with the pejorative connotation that rhetoric is a means of obscuring the truth. Classical philosophers believed quite the contrary: the skilled use of rhetoric was essential to the discovery of truths, because it provided the means of ordering and clarifying arguments.

=== Classical Athens ===
During the fifth century BCE, Athens had become an active metropolis undergoing an intellectual golden age. During this time the Greek city-state had been experimenting with a new form of government—democracy, demos, "the people". Political and cultural identity had been tied to the city area—the citizens of Athens formed institutions to the red processes: are the Senate, jury trials, and forms of public discussions, but people needed to learn how to navigate these new institutions. With no forms of passing on the information, other than word of mouth, Athenians needed an effective strategy to inform the people. A group of wandering Sicilians, later known as the Sophists, began teaching the Athenians persuasive speech, with the goal of navigating the courts and senate. The sophists became speech teachers known as Sophia; Greek for "wisdom" and root for philosophy, or "love of wisdom"—the sophists came to be common term for someone who sold wisdom for money. This ultimately led to concerns rising about the dissemination of falsehood over truth, with highly trained persuasive speakers who were knowingly misinforming their listeners.

==== Isocrates ====
Isocrates (436–338 BCE), like the Sophists, taught public speaking as a means of human improvement, but he worked to distinguish himself from the Sophists, whom he saw as claiming far more than they could deliver. He suggested that while an art of virtue or excellence did exist, it was only one piece, and the least, in a process of self-improvement that relied much more on honing one's talent, desire, constant practice, and the imitation of good models. Isocrates believed that practice in speaking publicly about noble themes and important questions would improve the character of both speaker and audience while also offering the best service to a city. Isocrates was an outspoken champion of rhetoric as a mode of civic engagement. He thus wrote his speeches as "models" for his students to imitate in the same way that poets might imitate Homer or Hesiod, seeking to inspire in them a desire to attain fame through civic leadership. His was the first permanent school in Athens and it is likely that Plato's Academy and Aristotle's Lyceum were founded in part as a response to Isocrates. Though he left no handbooks, his speeches ("Antidosis" and "Against the Sophists" are most relevant to students of rhetoric) became models of oratory and keys to his entire educational program. He was one of the canonical "Ten Attic Orators". He influenced Cicero and Quintilian, and through them, the entire educational system of the west.

==== Plato ====
Plato (427–347 BCE) outlined the differences between true and false rhetoric in a number of dialogues—particularly the Gorgias and Phaedrus, dialogues in which Plato disputes the sophistic notion that the art of persuasion (the Sophists' art, which he calls "rhetoric"), can exist independent of the art of dialectic. Plato claims that since Sophists appeal only to what seems probable, they are not advancing their students and audiences, but simply flattering them with what they want to hear. While Plato's condemnation of rhetoric is clear in the Gorgias, in the Phaedrus he suggests the possibility of a true art wherein rhetoric is based upon the knowledge produced by dialectic. He relies on a dialectically informed rhetoric to appeal to the main character, Phaedrus, to take up philosophy. Thus Plato's rhetoric is actually dialectic (or philosophy) "turned" toward those who are not yet philosophers and are thus unready to pursue dialectic directly. Plato's animosity against rhetoric, and against the Sophists, derives not only from their inflated claims to teach virtue and their reliance on appearances, but from the fact that his teacher, Socrates, was sentenced to death after Sophists' efforts.

Some scholars, however, see Plato not as an opponent of rhetoric but rather as a nuanced rhetorical theorist who dramatized rhetorical practice in his dialogues and imagined rhetoric as more than just oratory.

==== Aristotle ====
A marble bust of Aristotle

Aristotle: Rhetoric is an antistrophes to dialectic. "Let rhetoric [be defined as] an ability [dynamis], in each [particular] case, to see the available means of persuasion." "Rhetoric is a counterpart of dialectic" — an art of practical civic reasoning, applied to deliberative, judicial, and "display" speeches in political assemblies, lawcourts, and other public gatherings.

Aristotle (384–322 BCE) was a student of Plato who set forth an extended treatise on rhetoric that still repays careful study today. In the first sentence of The Art of Rhetoric, Aristotle says that "rhetoric is the antistrophe of dialectic". As the "antistrophe" of a Greek ode responds to and is patterned after the structure of the "strophe" (they form two sections of the whole and are sung by two parts of the chorus), so the art of rhetoric follows and is structurally patterned after the art of dialectic because both are arts of discourse production. While dialectical methods are necessary to find truth in theoretical matters, rhetorical methods are required in practical matters such as adjudicating somebody's guilt or innocence when charged in a court of law, or adjudicating a prudent course of action to be taken in a deliberative assembly.

For Plato and Aristotle, dialectic involves persuasion, so when Aristotle says that rhetoric is the antistrophe of dialectic, he means that rhetoric as he uses the term has a domain or scope of application that is parallel to, but different from, the domain or scope of application of dialectic. Claude Pavur explains that "[t]he Greek prefix 'anti' does not merely designate opposition, but it can also mean 'in place of'".

Aristotle's treatise on rhetoric systematically describes civic rhetoric as a human art or skill (techne). It is more of an objective theory than it is an interpretive theory with a rhetorical tradition. Aristotle's art of rhetoric emphasizes persuasion as the purpose of rhetoric. His definition of rhetoric as "the faculty of observing in any given case the available means of persuasion", essentially a mode of discovery, limits the art to the inventional process; Aristotle emphasizes the logical aspect of this process. A speaker supports the probability of a message by logical, ethical, and emotional proofs.

Aristotle identifies three steps or "offices" of rhetoric—invention, arrangement, and style—and three different types of rhetorical proof:

ethos
Aristotle's theory of character and how the character and credibility of a speaker can influence an audience to consider him/her to be believable—there being three qualities that contribute to a credible ethos: perceived intelligence, virtuous character, and goodwill
pathos
the use of emotional appeals to alter the audience's judgment through metaphor, amplification, storytelling, or presenting the topic in a way that evokes strong emotions in the audience
logos
the use of reasoning, either inductive or deductive, to construct an argument

Aristotle emphasized enthymematic reasoning as central to the process of rhetorical invention, though later rhetorical theorists placed much less emphasis on it. An "enthymeme" follows the form of a syllogism, however it excludes either the major or minor premise. An enthymeme is persuasive because the audience provides the missing premise. Because the audience participates in providing the missing premise, they are more likely to be persuaded by the message.

Aristotle identified three different types or genres of civic rhetoric:

Forensic (also known as judicial)
concerned with determining the truth or falseness of events that took place in the past and issues of guilt—for example, in a courtroom
Deliberative (also known as political)
concerned with determining whether or not particular actions should or should not be taken in the future—for example, making laws
Epideictic (also known as ceremonial)
concerned with praise and blame, values, right and wrong, demonstrating beauty and skill in the present—for example, a eulogy or a wedding toast

Another Aristotelian doctrine was the idea of topics (also referred to as common topics or commonplaces). Though the term had a wide range of application (as a memory technique or compositional exercise, for example) it most often referred to the "seats of argument"—the list of categories of thought or modes of reasoning—that a speaker could use to generate arguments or proofs. The topics were thus a heuristic or inventional tool designed to help speakers categorize and thus better retain and apply frequently used types of argument. For example, since we often see effects as "like" their causes, one way to invent an argument (about a future effect) is by discussing the cause (which it will be "like"). This and other rhetorical topics derive from Aristotle's belief that there are certain predictable ways in which humans (particularly non-specialists) draw conclusions from premises. Based upon and adapted from his dialectical Topics, the rhetorical topics became a central feature of later rhetorical theorizing, most famously in Cicero's work of that name.

=== Sophists ===
Teaching in oratory was popularized in the 5th century BCE by itinerant teachers known as sophists, the best known of whom were Protagoras (c. 481–420 BCE), Gorgias (c. 483–376 BCE), and Isocrates (436–338 BCE). Aspasia of Miletus is believed to be one of the first women to engage in private and public rhetorical activities as a Sophist. The Sophists were a disparate group who travelled from city to city, teaching in public places to attract students and offer them an education. Their central focus was on logos, or what we might broadly refer to as discourse, its functions and powers. They defined parts of speech, analyzed poetry, parsed close synonyms, invented argumentation strategies, and debated the nature of reality. They claimed to make their students better, or, in other words, to teach virtue. They thus claimed that human excellence was not an accident of fate or a prerogative of noble birth, but an art or "techne" that could be taught and learned. They were thus among the first humanists.

Several Sophists also questioned received wisdom about the gods and the Greek culture, which they believed was taken for granted by Greeks of their time, making these Sophists among the first agnostics. For example, some argued that cultural practices were a function of convention or nomos rather than blood or birth or phusis. They argued further that the morality or immorality of any action could not be judged outside of the cultural context within which it occurred. The well-known phrase, "Man is the measure of all things" arises from this belief. One of the Sophists' most famous, and infamous, doctrines has to do with probability and counter arguments. They taught that every argument could be countered with an opposing argument, that an argument's effectiveness derived from how "likely" it appeared to the audience (its probability of seeming true), and that any probability argument could be countered with an inverted probability argument. Thus, if it seemed likely that a strong, poor man were guilty of robbing a rich, weak man, the strong poor man could argue, on the contrary, that this very likelihood (that he would be a suspect) makes it unlikely that he committed the crime, since he would most likely be apprehended for the crime. They also taught and were known for their ability to make the weaker (or worse) argument the stronger (or better). Aristophanes famously parodies the clever inversions that sophists were known for in his play The Clouds.

The word "sophistry" developed negative connotations in ancient Greece that continue today, but in ancient Greece, Sophists were popular and well-paid professionals, respected for their abilities and also criticized for their excesses.

According to William Keith and Christian Lundberg, as the Greek society shifted towards more democratic values, the Sophists were responsible for teaching the newly democratic Greek society the importance of persuasive speech and strategic communication for its new governmental institutions.

== Ancient Rome ==
=== Cicero ===
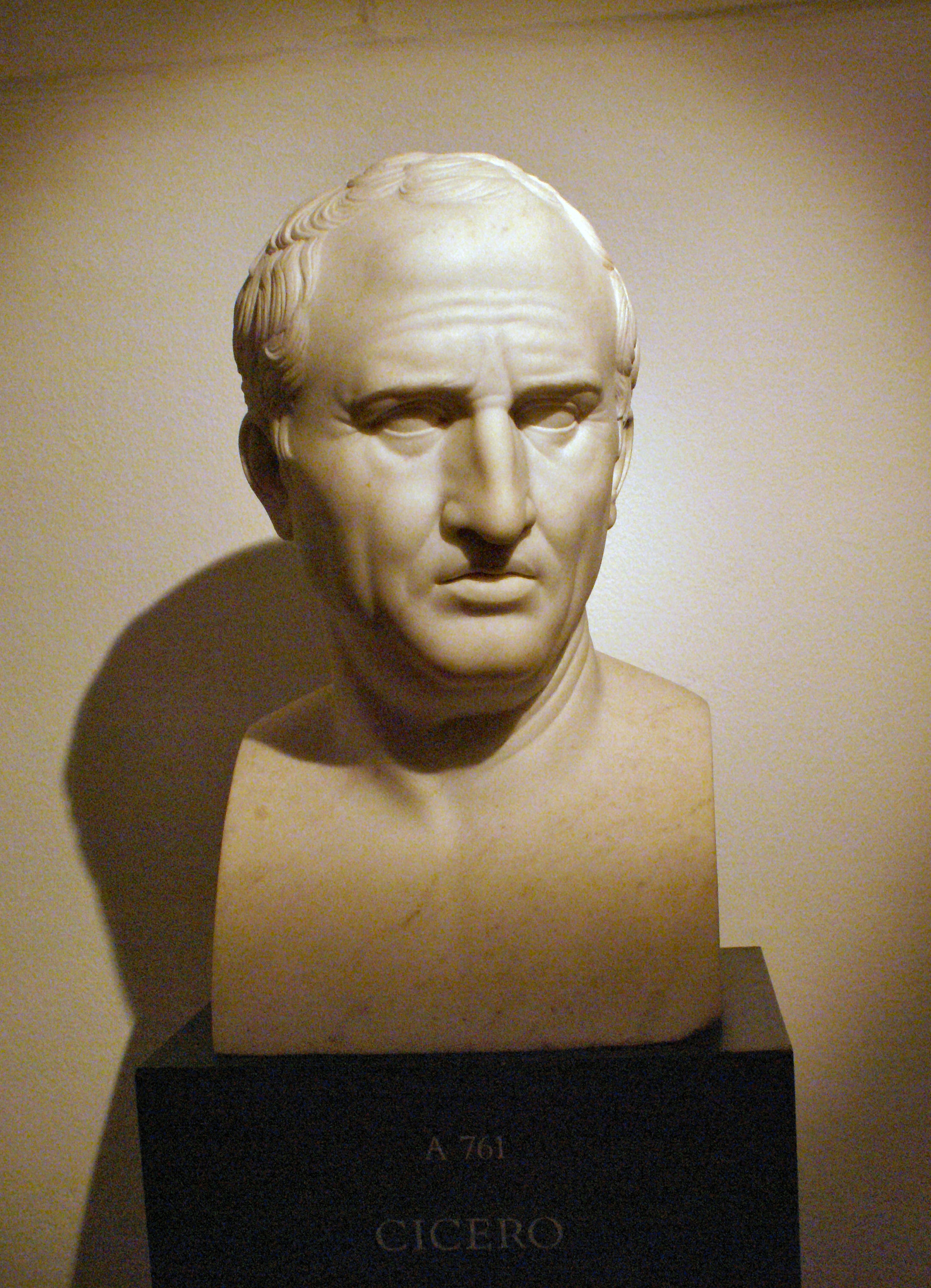
Bust of Marcus Tullius Cicero

For the Romans, oration became an important part of public life. Cicero (106–43 BCE) was chief among Roman rhetoricians and remains the best known ancient orator and the only orator who both spoke in public and produced treatises on the subject. Rhetorica ad Herennium, formerly attributed to Cicero but now considered to be of unknown authorship, is one of the most significant works on rhetoric and is still widely used as a reference today. It is an extensive reference on the use of rhetoric, and in the Middle Ages and Renaissance, it achieved wide publication as an advanced school text on rhetoric.

Cicero charted a middle path between the competing Attic and Asiatic styles to become considered second only to Demosthenes among history's orators. His works include the early and very influential De Inventione (On Invention, often read alongside Ad Herennium as the two basic texts of rhetorical theory throughout the Middle Ages and into the Renaissance), De Oratore (a fuller statement of rhetorical principles in dialogue form), Topics (a rhetorical treatment of common topics, highly influential through the Renaissance), Brutus (a discussion of famous orators), and Orator (a defense of Cicero's style). Cicero also left a large body of speeches and letters which would establish the outlines of Latin eloquence and style for generations.

The rediscovery of Cicero's speeches (such as the defense of Archias) and letters (to Atticus) by Italians like Petrarch helped to ignite the Renaissance.

Cicero championed the learning of Greek (and Greek rhetoric), contributed to Roman ethics, linguistics, philosophy, and politics, and emphasized the importance of all forms of appeal (emotion, humor, stylistic range, irony, and digression in addition to pure reasoning) in oratory. But perhaps his most significant contribution to subsequent rhetoric, and education in general, was his argument that orators learn not only about the specifics of their case (the hypothesis) but also about the general questions from which they derived (the theses). Thus, in giving a speech in defense of a poet whose Roman citizenship had been questioned, the orator should examine not only the specifics of that poet's civic status, he should also examine the role and value of poetry and of literature more generally in Roman culture and political life. The orator, said Cicero, needed to be knowledgeable about all areas of human life and culture, including law, politics, history, literature, ethics, warfare, medicine, and even arithmetic and geometry. Cicero gave rise to the idea that the "ideal orator" be well-versed in all branches of learning: an idea that was rendered as "liberal humanism", and that lives on today in liberal arts or general education requirements in colleges and universities around the world.

=== Quintilian ===
Quintilian (35–100 CE) began his career as a pleader in the courts of law; his reputation grew so great that Vespasian created a chair of rhetoric for him in Rome. The culmination of his life's work was the Institutio Oratoria (Institutes of Oratory, or alternatively, The Orator's Education), a lengthy treatise on the training of the orator, in which he discusses the training of the "perfect" orator from birth to old age and, in the process, reviews the doctrines and opinions of many influential rhetoricians who preceded him.

In the Institutes, Quintilian organizes rhetorical study through the stages of education that an aspiring orator would undergo, beginning with the selection of a nurse. Aspects of elementary education (training in reading and writing, grammar, and literary criticism) are followed by preliminary rhetorical exercises in composition (the progymnasmata) that include maxims and fables, narratives and comparisons, and finally full legal or political speeches. The delivery of speeches within the context of education or for entertainment purposes became widespread and popular under the term "declamation".

This work was available only in fragments in medieval times, but the discovery of a complete copy at the Abbey of St. Gall in 1416 led to its emergence as one of the most influential works on rhetoric during the Renaissance.

Quintilian's work describes not just the art of rhetoric, but the formation of the perfect orator as a politically active, virtuous, publicly minded citizen. His emphasis was on the ethical application of rhetorical training, in part in reaction against the tendency in Roman schools toward standardization of themes and techniques. At the same time that rhetoric was becoming divorced from political decision making, rhetoric rose as a culturally vibrant and important mode of entertainment and cultural criticism in a movement known as the "Second Sophistic", a development that gave rise to the charge (made by Quintilian and others) that teachers were emphasizing style over substance in rhetoric.
