= The Education of a Christian Prince =

1516 book by Erasmus for Charles V

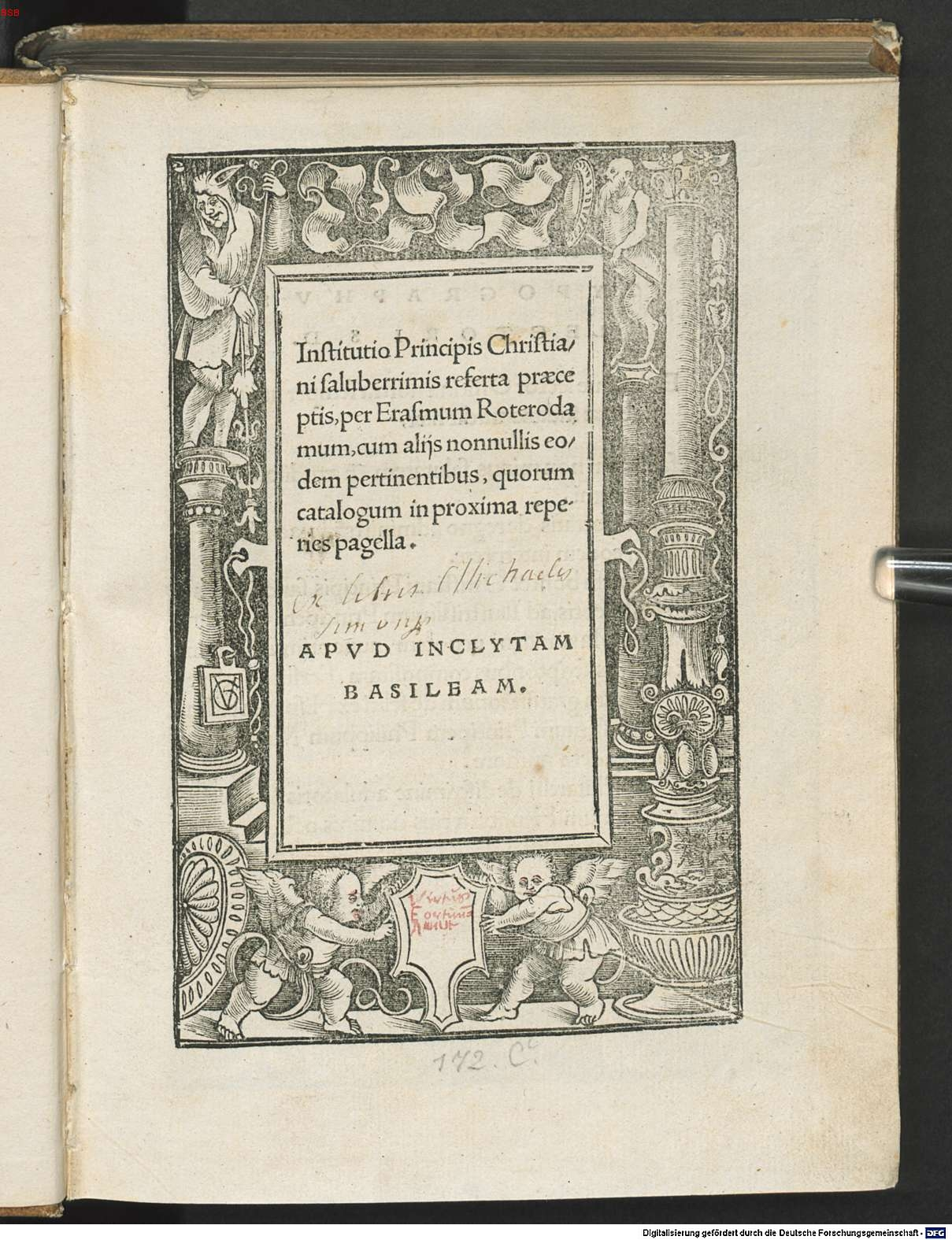
Title page of 1516 edition

The Education of a Christian Prince (Latin: Institutio principis Christiani) is a Renaissance mirror for princes, by Desiderius Erasmus, which advises the reader on how to be a good Christian prince. The book was dedicated to Prince Charles, who later became Habsburg Emperor Charles V.

Erasmus stated that teachers should be of gentle disposition and have unimpeachable morals. A good education included all the liberal arts. Like the Roman educator Quintilian, Erasmus was against corporal punishment for unruly students. He stressed the student must be treated as an individual. Erasmus attempted throughout the work to reconcile the writers of antiquity with the Christian ethics of his time.

The text was written in part to secure Erasmus a position as Prince Charles' tutor. He was appointed a tutor to Charles' brother, Ferdinand (later H.R.E. Ferdinand I), and became an honorary counselor of H.R.E. Charles V.

== Other works ==
Erasmus wrote the book in 1516, the same year that Thomas More finished his Utopia and three years after Machiavelli had written his advice book for rulers Il Principe. The Principe, however, was not published until 1532, 16 years later.

A comparison with The Prince is worth noting. Machiavelli stated that, to maintain control by political force, it is safer for a prince to be feared than loved. Erasmus preferred for the prince to be loved, and strongly suggested a well-rounded education in order to govern justly and benevolently and avoid becoming a source of oppression.

In 1523, Queen Catherine of Aragon commissioned Juan Luis Vives to write an equivalent book for the female side, The Education of a Christian Woman, for her daughter Mary I.

== Philosophia Christi ==
Christian Prince serves as a guide for the teacher and the prince as well as all court personnel who might have any reason to speak to or with him and espouses Erasmus' rhetorical approach to Christocentric political theories and pedagogical praxes which he refers to as the "philosophia Christi."

The concept of "philosophia Christi," Erasmus' primary topoi in Christian Prince, as defined by Erika Rummel as "a life centered on Christ and characterized by inner faith rather than external rites," was introduced more than a decade prior to the Christian Prince in a similar work, the Enchiridion Militis Christiani, (1504), the Handbook (or Dagger) of a Christian Soldier. At the conclusion of the preface, Erasmus, on the basis of this "philosophia Christi," admonishes the prince that "among the countless distinctions which under God your merit will win for you, it will be no small part of your reputation that Charles was a prince to whom a man need hesitate to offer the picture of a true and upright Christian prince without flattery, knowing that he would either gladly accept it as an excellent prince already, or wisely imitate it as a young man always in search of self-improvement."

"The cardinal principle of a good prince should be not only to preserve the present prosperity of the state but to pass it on more prosperous than when he received it." (Note: Vollerthun and Richardson note that this prosperity was not only material, but "also includes physical health and, most importantly, spiritual well-being.")

— Erasmus, The Education of a Christian Prince

== Rhetoric ==
Erasmus was a philologist, grammarian, theologian, and rhetorician. He is considered a key contributor to the rhetorical tradition because of his humanist approach to pedagogy, literary criticism, his own works (including letters), and oratory. The Education of a Christian Prince highlights rhetoric designed to furnish the best practices for a young man in a critical religious and political position.

Rhetoric’s foundational structure, at the turn of the sixteenth century, included classical teachings from Isocrates, Aristotle, and Cicero. Some of their respective foci and contributions, of which Erasmus would have been keenly aware, are as follows:

- Isocrates – In his well-known treatise, Against the Sophists, Isocrates rebukes sophists for charging exorbitant fees for promises they could not keep and "producing" learners who could speak on any subject at length. He, as an upper echelon sophist, consequently, opened a school that would afford him opportunities to teach "proper" rhetoric and yield model Greek citizens and well-trained leaders. For Isocrates, writing was critical to rhetoric.
- Aristotle – In the Art of Rhetoric, Aristotle defines rhetoric as "the power to observe the persuasiveness of which any particular matter admits." Among Aristotelian methods of persuasion were; the topoi (places), common particular topics from which an argument can be constructed; three offices of rhetoric: invention, arrangement and style; the three proofs of rhetoric: ethos, based on the speaker’s or writer’s character, logos based on inductive or deductive reasoning; and pathos which relies on an audience's sensibility to a particular subject); the three genres of rhetoric: forensic, the judicial, concerned with determining truth or falsity of events that took place in the past; the deliberative, or political, concerned with determining whether or not action should or should not be taken in the future, and epideictic, the ceremonial, and concerned with praise and blame, values/ethics/virtue, and skill in the present). Aristotle founded The Lyceum, a peripatetic school.
- Cicero – On the Ideal Orator (De Oratore) is a dialogic treatise addressed to Cicero's brother, Quintus, which Cicero refers to as a more mature work than his previously published On Invention (De Inventione). The interlocutors in the dialogue, primarily Crassus and Antonius, posit that the ideal orator has the following qualities: a wealth of knowledge (Crassus); the rhetorical ability to "first win people over, second, to instruct them, and third, to stir their feelings" (Antonius), a point similar to Aristotle's division of ethos, logos, pathos; is a master of invention and style, including correct language, clarity, distinction, and appropriateness, and eloquence; and uses natural ability with willingness to imitate a great teacher for the sake of effectually perfecting the natural ability and not for the cloning of the teacher.

Erasmus uses this knowledge of classical rhetoric in his writing. Erasmus's ethos within The Education of a Christian Prince (Institutio principis christiani), in the Isocratean manner of setting himself apart from potentially incompetent teachers, shows disdain against sophists. In the preface of Christian Prince addressed to Charles the prince, Erasmus states that Isocrates "was a sophist, instructing some petty king or rather tyrant, and both were pagans." Erasmus' use of logos and pathos immediately follow when he completes the eschewing of Isocrates: "I am a theologian addressing a renowned and upright prince, Christians both of us." A recent critic, Peter Gay describes Erasmus as "a true classical spirit in his search for clarity and simplicity, a modern in complexity, an ancestor of the Enlightenment in his critical temper and pacific cosmopolitanism. But, above all, he was a Christian intellectual." And while Cicero was considered the "patron saint of the Renaissance era" – a title that would become fundamentally problematic for a number of Christians because of his pagan beliefs – Erasmus came to be known as the "prince of humanists" esteemed by many of his contemporaries as a "man born to bring back literature."

Erasmus' stylistic form of writing was often compared to the standards set forth by Cicero, particularly influenced by his De Inventione; however, Erasmus' primary goal for Christian Prince and all of his works, as he argued, was to be seen as "a Christian rather than a Ciceronian." The Christian Prince is an example of Erasmus' rhetorically stylistic mastery that serves as a testament to his ability to imbue the teachings of Christ while embodying Cicero's concept of "imitator". For example, Christ told his disciples a parable of wheat and tares growing in the same field and that it was not their responsibility, but His, to separate the two (Matt. 13:24-43). Erasmus, a consummate rhetorician, managed to quell the concerns of many fellow Christians by "Christianizing" pagan ideologies as part of his role in and contribution to the Renaissance humanist tradition. For according to Peter Bietenholz, and in concert with Aristotle’s idea of lexis, the pure knowledge of language, "the humanist, first and last, is a rhetorician, a linguist. His professional devotion as well as skill is aligned to verba (words), not to res (things). His real gesta (deeds) are verba, the words, and not res gestae, the actions of historical significance."

Erasmus indeed employs, primarily, deliberative and epideictic forms of rhetoric within Christian Prince, because it has the purpose of a conduct book, also referred to as a courtesy book or hortative and advisory literature. At the time of its publishing, the conduct book was beginning to witness a change in its popularity as a bourgeoning genre though it can be seen in such classics as Plato's Republic and, in Erasmus's own time, with the likes of Machiavelli’s The Prince and Thomas More’s Utopia.

== Integration with classical pagan thought ==
Throughout the Christian Prince, Erasmus deftly invokes the knowledge, wisdom and ultimately, truth, to be gleaned from other great thinkers of antiquity such as Plato, Seneca, and Plutarch who seems to have influenced Erasmus most, who will point the prince to Truth. Its opening sentence begins with Erasmus positing that "wisdom in itself is a wonderful thing ..., and no kind of wisdom is rated more excellent by Aristotle than that which teaches how to be a beneficent prince; for Xenophon ..., rightly considers that there is something beyond human nature, something wholly divine, in absolute rule over free and willing subjects." However, Erasmus never recommends the pagan authors or their works singularly or in isolation because in the next breath, he makes a seamless rhetorical move to remind the prince that of all the requests King Solomon could have made when God told him he would grant whatever he asked, Solomon's prayer was for wisdom to lead God's people.

A similar rhetorical move in reverse can be found in a most noteworthy chapter of the treatise, "The Prince Must Avoid Flatterers." As Erasmus offers the pedagogue a recommended list of readings for the prince as student, he first lists the proverbs of Solomon, Ecclesiasticus, and the Book of Wisdom then next the Gospels. The total number of biblical references here is seven. He then recommends works from pagan authors: three from Plutarch the Apophthegms, Moralia, and Lives; writings from Seneca (no specific titles provided, but he does pluralize the suggestion); from Aristotle, the Politics; from Cicero the Offices and Laws; and from Plato, the Republic, but because the work was lost at the time, he recommends his Laws. The pagan number of works surpasses the number of biblical works. Erasmus justifies his approach of dissoi logoi, arguing from two contrary accounts, by persuading the prince to always apply the following caveat: "This writer whom you are reading is a pagan and you are a Christian reader; although he has many excellent things to say, he nevertheless does not depict the ideal of a Christian quite accurately, and you must take care not to think that whatever you come across at any point is to be imitated straight away, but instead test everything against the standard of Christ."

Although offering an Augustinian-type approach by emphasizing the Christian prince's ability to interpret pagan texts, Erasmus would continue to have strained relations with some Church Fathers regarding his rhetorical methodologies toward Truth. Despite this, the Christian Prince "saw ten editions during Erasmus' lifetime and was translated into a number of vernacular languages, which testifies to a general interest in the work."

== Quotes ==
- "Conduct your own rule as if you were striving to ensure that no successor could be your equal, but all the time prepare your children for their future reign as if to ensure that a better man would indeed succeed you."
- "He acquires most who requires nothing, but commands respect."
