= Comparatio =

Rhetorical strategy of comparison

Comparatio in classical rhetoric is strategy that uses comparison to persuade people. Comparatio relies upon people's knowledge or beliefs about a phenomenon, and then discursively "links" that phenomenon to a different phenomenon about which the speaker/writer wishes to make a claim.

For example, if someone wanted to persuade an audience of the merit of putting in a new freeway system, they could use comparatio as a rhetorical strategy. They might compare the new freeway system to a "river of life flowing through our community" or they could call it a "path to commercial vibrance."

Comparisons can also be made to phenomena about which an audience could be expected to have negative feelings. For example, if one were opposed to the new freeway because of the environmental damage it would do to waterfowl nesting areas, they might compare the new freeway to "a corridor of death for our bird species."

The rhetorical success of comparatio hinges upon comparing your claim to a phenomenon that is:

- familiar to the audience
- likely to evoke emotional feelings
- adequately similar to your claim to seem logical.

It would not, for example, work well to call the freeway a "ham sandwich lodged in the throat of the community." The freeway seems more logically related to the throat (a passageway or throughway) than an obstacle in that passageway.
