= Plan of Study for Girls =

16th-century educational curriculum by Juan Luis Vives

Plan of Study for Girls was an educational curriculum devised in the 16th century by Juan Luis Vives for the education of girls, primarily for Princess Mary, daughter and then-heiress of Henry VIII of England and his first wife, Catherine of Aragon.

The curriculum was written at the request of the then Queen. Vives delivered the work, De Ratione Studii Puerilis in the form of a long letter, written from Oxford in October 1523. Two separate texts were included; one, with advice for a girl's education, was aimed at Princess Mary Tudor; the second text, dealing with the education of boys, was aimed at Charles Mountjoy, the son of the queen's chamberlain William Mountjoy.

The text for the Princess Mary Tudor advised that she should "write down with her fingers anything the tutor should designate", and that she focus particularly on learning the Latin names for "clothes, parts of the house, food, divisions of time, musical instruments, [and] house furniture".

== See also ==
- The Education of a Christian Woman
