= The Education of a Christian Woman =

1523 book by Juan Luis Vives

The Education (or Instruction) of a Christian Woman was an early sixteenth-century book by Juan Luis Vives, written for the education of the future Mary I of England, precocious daughter of Henry VIII. Written in 1523, the book was originally published in Latin with the title of De Institutione Feminae Christianae and was dedicated to Catherine of Aragon. The work was translated into English by Richard Hyrde around 1529 becoming then known by the title Instruction of a Christian Woman.

During the sixteenth and seventeenth centuries the work was popular in both the Catholic and Protestant communities. This treatise on female education is divided into three parts: Book I “Which Treats of Unmarried Young Women”, Book II “Which Treats of Married Women,” and Book III “On Widows.”

Praised by Erasmus and Thomas More, Vives advocated education for all women, regardless of social class and ability. From childhood through adolescence to marriage and widowhood, this manual offers practical advice as well as philosophical meditation and was recognized soon after publication in 1524 as the most authoritative pronouncement on the universal education of women. Arguing that women were intellectually equal to men, Vives stressed intellectual companionship in marriage over procreation, and moved beyond the private sphere to show how women's progress was essential for the good of society and state.

== See also ==
- The Education of a Christian Prince
- Plan of Study for Girls
