= Hans-Joachim Newiger =

German classical philologist (1925–2011)

Hans-Joachim Newiger (1 April 1925 – 26 December 2011) was a German classical philologist.

== Life ==
Born in Königsberg, Newiger was appointed on 21 December 1953 at the University of Kiel with his Dissertation Metaphern und Chorpersonifikationen bei Aristophanes, which was published in 1957 in extended form under the title Metapher und Allegorie. Studien zu Aristophanes (2000 reprint). In 1955/56 he received the Reisestipendium des Deutschen Archäologischen Instituts. His habilitation was completed in 1968 at the University of Kiel under Hans Diller and Walter Bröcker with a study of the writing of Gorgias about the non-being. From 1969 to 1971 he was professor of classical philology at the TU Berlin. In 1971 he was appointed to the chair of Gräzistik at the newly founded University of Konstanz which he held until his retirement in 1992 in Bielefeld where he died on 26 December 2011 at the age of 86.

Newiger was one of the leading Aristophanes experts. He was a corresponding member of the Deutsches Archäologisches Institut.

== Publications ==
- Drama und Theater. Ausgewählte Schriften zum griechischen Drama, ed. by Michael Erler, Martin Hose, Bernhard Zimmermann, Stuttgart 1996 (Drama Beiheft 2).
- Die Orestie und das Theater.

== Literature ==
- Bernhard Zimmermann: "Hans-Joachim Newiger †." In Gnomon. Volume 84 (2012), pp. 764–767 (with picture)
