= Antidosis (treatise) =

Spoken treatise by the ancient Greek rhetorician Isocrates

Antidosis (Ancient Greek ἀντίδοσις) is the title of a spoken treatise by the ancient Greek rhetorician Isocrates. The Antidosis can be viewed as a defense, an autobiography, or a rhetorical treatise. However, since Isocrates wrote it when he was 82 years old, it is generally seen by some people as an autobiography. The title term, "antidosis", literally translates as "an exchange" and was applied in ancient Greek courts as a peculiar law pertaining to an exchange of estates between two parties. If one of the 1,200 wealthiest Athenians eligible was tasked with the performance of a public liturgy and financing one of the many public concerns of Athens, he could avoid the duty by nominating a richer man who was more qualified than himself to perform it. If the supposedly richer man disagreed with the terms, then the entirety of their estates would be exchanged and the now more wealthy man would have to perform the liturgy, as originally planned. The law inspired Isocrates' Antidosis, which was written in the form of a court case where Isocrates had to defend himself from a charge of corrupting the youth by teaching them how to speak well in order for them to gain an unfair advantage over their peers. Although this work is put forward by Isocrates as his imagined defense in a legal case, it is more a treatise on morality and teaching.

== As a court case ==
Although it is assumed that he is defending himself from a charge of corrupting the youth, nowhere in his Antidosis does Isocrates mention what crime he is charged with and from which he must defend, nor does it say what the penalty would be for being found guilty. Isocrates also does not make any attempt to offer evidence in his favor, yet presents the defense that he is a good teacher to his students as the full defense for the crime that he has committed. There is no specific mention of anything that would prove him innocent in this particular case.

Another idea by scholars is that early on in the Antidosis, Isocrates reads aloud that he is being indicted for corrupting his students. He is accused of educating his students to speak against the courts, question the laws, and think for themselves. Isocrates says, "Here is the indictment my accuser endeavors to vilify me, charging that I corrupt young men by teaching them to speak and gain their won advantage in the courts contrary to justice..." Isocrates is being charged by Lysimachus, who has accused Isocrates of receiving money from his students. In return, Isocrates has been teaching them how to become better public speakers and leaders. Isocrates proves his innocence by showing that through instructing his students in rhetoric, he is teaching them how to become better citizens and leaders of Athens. Isocrates proved his rationale by citing the accomplishments and devotion to the state his students displayed after being educated by him. He says in his defense, "But, I beg of you, consider well whether I appear to you to corrupt the young by my words, or, on the contrary, to inspire them to a life of valor and of dangers endured for their country..." B. Keith Murphy says of Isocrates's defense, "For Isocrates, it is through rhetoric that we can approximate truth, or at least a consensual truth. A man who is trained in rhetoric is trained in truth, and the creation of that truth through oratory."

In the sense that he is defending himself from an onerous charge to perform a liturgy, Isocrates makes a claim that his value to the city was provided through his teaching. He states that as a lifelong teacher, the value of the education that he has provided to students is worth far more than any monetary donation he can give to Athens. His teaching has provided for civic-minded and properly educated citizens who contribute to the orderly running of the city-state. For Isocrates to be sentenced to death would be to ignore the public service that he has performed for the city, by which he has devoted his life to giving its citizens a proper rhetorical education.

== As an autobiography ==
Isocrates was 82 years old at the time he wrote Antidosis, the longest work of his life. Antidosis is used by the author to depict himself as a model citizen and a contributor to the city-state of Athens. Since he was nearing the end of his life, he presumably would have wanted to leave behind a legacy of a devoted and moderate citizen to his hometown and to justify his life as a service to Athens and the citizens to whom he taught rhetoric. Isocrates presents himself as a quiet citizen who avoids the public light, where oratory is used in a way to bring cases of litigation against each other—something that the elite believed to negatively affect the way in which the republic was run. He tries to withdraw himself from the public interfering and intrusive efforts made into democratic politics.

The Antidosis is not seen by some as an autobiography of Isocrates; it was written later in his life as a fictionalized story similar to his own court trial. While there are similarities between Isocrates's real court case and the one in the Antidosis, many aspects of the case were fictionalized. Examples are Lysimachus being the person who has brought Isocrates to trial for this crime, and the crime being different from the one with which he was actually accused. According to George Norlin, "At any rate, in the Antidosis—a title which he borrows from the actual suit to which he had just been subjected—he adopts the fiction of a capital charge brought against him by an informer named Lysimachus, and of a trial before a court with its accessories."

It is known that in his own life, Isocrates did in fact go to court in his own defense over an amount of money he was made to pay. Isocrates argued this fine was based on the fact people thought he was wealthier than he actually was. He claimed this distorted perception of his wealth was due to his popularity as a public figure. This is similar to Isocrates's defense in the Antidosis, in which he claims he has been indicted due to the fact he is a very successful person, people are jealous of him, and people want to publicly embarrass him. In the Antidosis, Isocrates is charged with corrupting the youth by teaching them to become good public speakers. With this ability, the students may trick people by convincing them of false truths that could ultimately allow the students to corrupt the government. This is an obvious defense of his life's work of teaching.

== As a rhetorical treatise ==
Isocrates states that the teacher should be judged by his students, in that if they do good and moral works, then the teacher has done a good job and should be praised. This directly opposes Gorgias' view that it is not up to him how his students use what he teaches them.

At the end of his Antidosis, Isocrates explains how he attempts to keep his students in high moral standing by discouraging some of the more debaucherous behaviors available in the city, such as "participating in drinking bouts and tossing dice in gambling dens". He posits the idea that as a teacher, he can be judged as successful by the moral ways in which his students live their lives when compared to other young men, who are wasting their youth in revelry. Hence, he agrees to submit to the punishment if any of his students can be shown to be bad influences on society and challenges his accuser to present even one student who could be said to belong to the group of degenerate youth.

Another important topic is natural talent. Isocrates argues that native ability is necessary for becoming a good orator, along with a proper education on the subject, and practical experience.

== Commentary ==
D. S. Hutchinson and Monte Johnson have (2010) pointed out:

Aristotle's Protrepticus was written in the late 350s in polemical response to a work by the Athenian philosopher and teacher Isocrates, called the Antidosis. In this work, Isocrates contested the application of the word philosophy to the kind of abstract and speculative mathematical preoccupations current in Plato's Academy. For him, education and philosophy meant training men to become effective political leaders, and the means to this was training in rhetoric. Speculation about advanced mathematics, astronomy, and the "elements" or "principles" of nature were useful as "mental gymnastic" for the young but, according to the argument, in adulthood become distractions from the important business of military, political, and legal action. In the Protrepticus, Aristotle responded to Isocrates' attack on Academic philosophy by defending the search for the elements and principles of nature as the best means not only for political science, but for every other goal in life as well.

== See also ==
- Protrepticus (Aristotle)

== Footnotes ==
- Bonner, Robert J. "The Legal Setting of Isocrates' Antidosis", Classical Philology, Vol. 15, No. 2 (Apr. 1920), pp. 193–197.
- Isocrates. The Antidosis. Harvard: Harvard UP, 1929.
- Murphy, B. Keith. "Isocrates." Salem Press, 1998.
- Norlin, George. The Antidosis. Harvard: Harvard UP, 1929.
- Too, Yun Lee. A Commentary on Isocrates' Antidosis. N.p.: Oxford University Press 2008.
