= Hans Diller =

German classical scholar and historian

Hans Diller (September 8, 1905 in Worms – December 15, 1977 in Kiel) was a German classical scholar and historian of ancient Greek medicine.

== Life and work ==
Diller obtained a doctorate in 1930 in Hamburg, and later studied in Leipzig in 1932 before returning to Hamburg as a lecturer.

In 1933 Diller signed the Vow of allegiance of the Professors of the German Universities and High-Schools to Adolf Hitler and the National Socialistic State.

In 1937, he made an application for Nazi Party membership and the same year he became an associate professor in Rostock. He was accepted into the Nazi party in 1940.

After the end of World War II, he denied before the denazification commission his party membership and received an appointment as professor of classical philology at Kiel, where he remained until his retirement. He rejected offers to move to Mainz (1952), although he became a full member of the Academy of Sciences and Literature based there, and further rejected offers to move to Cologne (1958) and Hamburg (1960) . For the academic year 1950/51 he was appointed rector of the Christian-Albrechts University in Kiel.

One of his main areas of research was Hippocratic medicine. He published a book in 1970 dedicated to this field, and partly consisted of work written by Hippocrates originally. In addition, he also concerned himself with the Greek tragedians and co-authored works about Sophocles, for example. For his efforts he was awarded in 1962 an honorary doctorate at the University of Athens.

Diller taught a number of notable scholars including Hermann Grensemann, Hans-Joachim Newiger, Gert Preiser and Renate Wittern-Sterzel.

== Works ==
Monographs

- Die Überlieferung der Hippokratischen Schrift Peri aerōn hydatōn topōn. Dieterich, Leipzig 1932.
- Wanderarzt und Aitiologe. Studien zur Hippokratischen Schrift Peri aerōn ydatōn topōn. Dieterich, Leipzig 1934.
- Die Bakchen und ihre Stellung im Spätwerk des Euripides. Verlag der Akademie der Wissenschaften und der Literatur, Mainz 1955.
- Kleine Schriften zur antiken Literatur. Hrsg. von Hans-Joachim Newiger und Hans Seyffert. C.H. Beck, München 1971 (mit Verzeichnis der Schriften 1932–1970; Kurzlebenslauf S. 635–636).
- Kleine Schriften zur antiken Medizin. Hrsg. von Gerhard Baader und Hermann Grensemann. de Gruyter, Berlin 1973, ISBN 3-11-001799-7.

Text editions and translations

- Hippokrates: Schriften. Die Anfänge der abendländischen Medizin. Reinbek, Rowohlt 1962; Neuausgabe u.d.T. Hippokrates: Ausgewählte Schriften. Mit einem bibliographischen Anhang von Karl-Heinz Leven. Stuttgart, Reclam 1994, ISBN 3-15-009319-8 (Kurzlebenslauf S. 342–43).
- Hippokrates: Über die Umwelt. Akademie-Verlag, Berlin 1970 (Corpus medicorum Graecorum 1,1,2). 2. unveränderte Auflage 1998.

== Bibliography ==
- Ernst Klee: Das Personenlexikon zum dritten Reich: Wer war was vor und nach 1945?. Fischer, 2003, ISBN 3-10-039309-0
