= Gorgias =

Greek philosopher and sophist (483–375 BC)

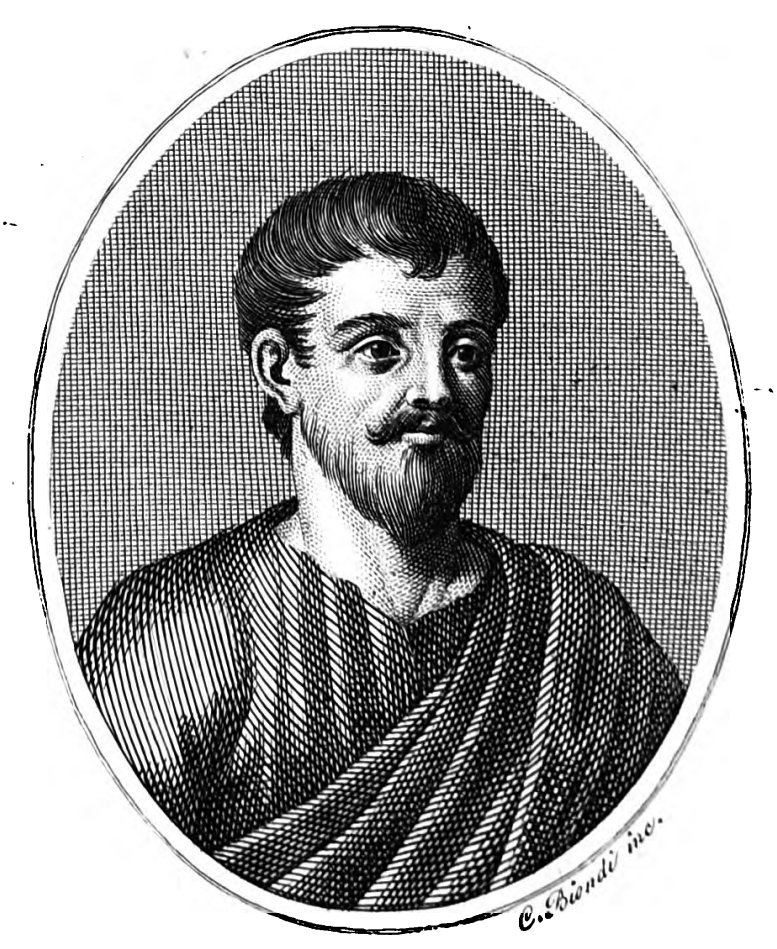
- Born: c. 483 BC; Leontinoi, Sicily, Magna Graecia
- Died: c. 375 BC (aged c. 108)

Philosophical work
- Era: Pre-Socratic philosophy
- Region: Western philosophy
- School: Sophists
- Main interests: Ontology, epistemology, rhetoric, moral relativism
- Notable ideas: Paradoxologia

Gorgias (/ˈɡɔːrdʒiəs/ GOR-jee-əs; Ancient Greek: Γοργίας; c. 483 BC – c. 375 BC) was an ancient Greek sophist, pre-Socratic philosopher, and rhetorician who was a native of Leontinoi in Sicily. Several doxographers report that he was a pupil of Empedocles, although he would only have been a few years younger. W. K. C. Guthrie writes that "Like other Sophists, he was an itinerant that practiced in various cities and giving public exhibitions of his skill at the great pan-Hellenic centers of Olympia and Delphi, and charged fees for his instruction and performances. A special feature of his displays was to ask miscellaneous questions from the audience and give impromptu replies." He has been called "Gorgias the Nihilist", although the degree to which this epithet adequately describes his philosophy is controversial.

Prominent among his claims to recognition is that he transplanted rhetoric from his native Sicily to Attica, and contributed to the diffusion of the Attic dialect as the language of literary prose.

== Life ==
Map of the Mediterranean showing locations associated with Gorgias

Gorgias was born c. 483 BC in Leontinoi, a Chalcidian colony in eastern Sicily that was allied with Athens. His father's name was Charmantides. He had a brother named Herodicus, who was a physician, and sometimes accompanied him during his travels. He also had a sister, whose name is not known, but whose grandson dedicated a golden statue to his great uncle at Delphi. It is not known whether Gorgias married or had children. Gorgias is said to have studied under the Sicilian philosopher Empedocles of Acragas (c. 490 – c. 430 BC), but it is not known when, where, for how long, or in what capacity. He may have also studied under the rhetoricians Corax of Syracuse and Tisias, but very little is known about either of these men, nor is anything known about their relationship with Gorgias.

It is not known what kind of role Gorgias may have played in the politics in his native Leontinoi, but it is known that, in 427 BC, when he was around sixty years old, he was sent to Athens by his fellow-citizens as the head of an embassy to ask for Athenian protection against the aggression of the Syracusans. After 427 BC, Gorgias appears to have settled in mainland Greece, living at various points in a number of city-states, including Athens and Larisa. He was well known for delivering orations at Panhellenic Festivals and is described as having been "conspicuous" at Olympia. There is no surviving record of any role he might have played in organizing the festivals themselves.

Gorgias's primary occupation was as a teacher of rhetoric. According to Aristotle, his students included Isocrates. (Other students are named in later traditions; the Suda adds Pericles, Polus, and Alcidamas, Diogenes Laërtius mentions Antisthenes, and according to Philostratus, "I understand that he attracted the attention of the most admired men, Critias and Alcibiades who were young, and Thucydides and Pericles who were already old. Agathon too, the tragic poet, whom Comedy regards as wise and eloquent, often Gorgianizes in his iambic verse"). Additionally, although they are not described as his students, Gorgias is widely thought to have influenced the styles of the historian Thucydides, the tragic playwright Agathon, the doctor Hippocrates, the rhetorician Alcidamas, and the poet and commentator Lycophron.

Gorgias is reputed to have lived to be one hundred and eight years old (Matsen, Rollinson and Sousa, 33). He won admiration for his ability to speak on any subject (Matsen, Rollinson and Sousa, 33). He accumulated considerable wealth; enough to commission a gold statue of himself for a public temple. After his Pythian Oration, the Greeks installed a solid gold statue of him in the temple of Apollo at Delphi (Matsen, Rollinson and Sousa, 33). He died at Larissa in Thessaly.

== Philosophy ==
The philosophies of the pre-Socratic Greek Sophists are much debated among scholars in general, due to their highly subtle and ambiguous writings and also to the fact that they are best known as characters in Plato's dialogues. Gorgias, however, is particularly frustrating for modern scholars to attempt to understand. While scholars debate the precise subtleties of the teachings of Protagoras, Hippias, and Prodicus, they generally agree on the basic frameworks of what these thinkers believed. With Gorgias, however, scholars widely disagree on even the most basic framework of his ideas, including over whether or not that framework even existed at all. The greatest hindrance to scholarly understanding of Gorgias's philosophy is that the vast majority of his writings have been lost and those that have survived have suffered considerable alteration by later copyists.

These difficulties are further compounded by the fact that Gorgias's rhetoric is frequently elusive and confusing; he makes many of his most important points using elaborate, but highly ambiguous, metaphors, similes, and puns. Many of Gorgias's propositions are also thought to be sarcastic, playful, or satirical. In his treatise On Rhetoric, Aristotle characterizes Gorgias's style of oratory as "pervasively ironic" and states that Gorgias recommended responding to seriousness with jests and to jests with seriousness. Gorgias frequently blurs the lines between serious philosophical discourse and satire, which makes it extremely difficult for scholars to tell when he is being serious and when he is merely joking. Gorgias frequently contradicts his own statements and adopts inconsistent perspectives on different issues. As a result of all these factors, Scott Porter Consigny calls him "perhaps the most elusive of the polytropic quarry hunted in Plato's Sophist.

Gorgias has been labelled "The Nihilist" because some scholars have interpreted his thesis on "the non-existent" to be an argument against the existence of anything that is straightforwardly endorsed by Gorgias himself. According to Alan Pratt, nihilism is "the belief that all values are baseless and that nothing can be known or communicated." It is associated with pessimism and a radical skepticism that condemns existence.

Gorgias presented his nihilist arguments in On Non-Existence; however, the original text is no longer extant. We only know his arguments through commentary by Sextus Empiricus and Pseudo-Aristotle's De Melisso, Xenophane, Gorgia. Ostensibly Gorgias developed three sequential arguments: first, that nothing exists; second, that even if existence exists, it is incomprehensible to humans; and third, that even if existence is apprehensible, it certainly cannot be communicated or interpreted to one's neighbors.

That being said, there is consensus in late 20th century and early 21st century scholarship that the label 'nihilist' is misleading, in part because if his argument were genuinely meant to support nihilism it would be self-undermining. The argument is itself something, and has pretensions to communicate knowledge, in conflict with its explicit pronouncement that there is nothing and that it can't be known or communicated. Gisela Striker argues: "I find it hard to believe that anyone should ever have thought that Gorgias seriously advocated the view that nothing is and that he was, therefore, a 'nihilist.'" Similarly Caston states: "Gorgias would have to be not merely disconsolate, but quite dull-witted, to have missed the conflict between his presentation and its content". Finally, Wardy says, "This sadly mistaken reading overlooks the most obvious consequence of Gorgias' paradoxologia (παραδοξολογία): his message refutes itself, and in consequence, so far from constituting a theory of logos, it confronts us with a picture of what language cannot be, with what it cannot be assumed to aspire to be." Gigon and Newiger make similar points.

== Rhetorical innovation ==
Gorgias ushered in rhetorical innovations involving structure and ornamentation, and he introduced paradoxologia – the idea of paradoxical thought and paradoxical expression. For these advancements, Gorgias has been labeled the "father of sophistry" (Wardy 6). Gorgias is also known for contributing to the diffusion of the Attic Greek dialect as the language of literary prose. Gorgias was the first orator known to develop and teach a "distinctive style of speaking" (Matsen, Rollinson and Sousa, 33).

Gorgias' extant rhetorical works – Encomium of Helen (Ἑλένης ἐγκώμιον), Defense of Palamedes (Ὑπέρ Παλαμήδους ἀπολογία), On Non-Existence (Περὶ τοῦ μὴ ὄντος ἢ Περὶ φύσεως), and Epitaphios (Επιτάφιος) – come to us via a work entitled Technai (Τέχναι), a manual of rhetorical instruction, which may have consisted of models to be memorized and demonstrate various principles of rhetorical practice (Leitch, et al. 29). Although some scholars claim that each work presents opposing statements, the four texts can be read as interrelated contributions to the up-and-coming theory and art (technē) of rhetoric (McComiskey 32). Of Gorgias' surviving works, only the Encomium and the Defense are believed to exist in their entirety. Meanwhile, there are his own speeches, rhetorical, political, or other. A number of these are referred to and quoted by Aristotle, including a speech on Hellenic unity, a funeral oration for Athenians fallen in war, and a brief quotation from an Encomium on the Eleans. Apart from the speeches, there are paraphrases of the treatise "On Nature or the Non-Existent." These works are each part of the Diels-Kranz collection, and although academics consider this source reliable, many of the works included are fragmentary and corrupt. Questions have also been raised as to the authenticity and accuracy of the texts attributed to Gorgias (Consigny 4).

Gorgias' writings are intended to be both rhetorical (persuasive) and performative. He goes to great lengths to exhibit his ability of making an absurd, argumentative position appear stronger. Consequently, each of his works defend positions that are unpopular, paradoxical and even absurd. The performative nature of Gorgias' writings is exemplified by the way that he playfully approaches each argument with stylistic devices such as parody, artificial figuration and theatricality (Consigny 149). Gorgias' style of argumentation can be described as poetics-minus-the-meter (poiêsis-minus-meter). Gorgias argues that persuasive words have power (dunamis) that is equivalent to that of the gods and as strong as physical force. In the Encomium, Gorgias likens the effect of speech on the soul to the effect of drugs on the body: "Just as different drugs draw forth different humors from the body – some putting a stop to disease, others to life – so too with words: some cause pain, others joy, some strike fear, some stir the audience to boldness, some benumb and bewitch the soul with evil persuasion" (Gorgias 32). The Encomium "argues for the totalizing power of language."

Gorgias also believed that his "magical incantations" would bring healing to the human psyche by controlling powerful emotions. He paid particular attention to the sounds of words, which, like poetry, could captivate audiences. His florid, rhyming style seemed to hypnotize his audiences (Herrick 42).

Unlike other Sophists, such as Protagoras, Gorgias did not profess to teach arete (excellence, or, virtue). He believed that there was no absolute form of arete, but that it was relative to each situation. For example, virtue in a slave was not the same as virtue in a statesman. He believed that rhetoric, the art of persuasion, was the king of all sciences, since he saw it as a techné with which one could persuade an audience toward any course of action. While rhetoric existed in the curriculum of every Sophist, Gorgias placed more prominence upon it than any of the others.

Much debate over both the nature and value of rhetoric begins with Gorgias. Plato's dialogue Gorgias presents a counter-argument to Gorgias' embrace of rhetoric, its elegant form, and performative nature (Wardy 2). The dialogue tells the story of a debate about rhetoric, politics and justice that occurred at a dinner gathering between Socrates and a small group of Sophists. Plato attempts to show that rhetoric does not meet the requirements to actually be considered a technê but rather is a somewhat dangerous "knack" to possess, both for the orator and for his audience, because it gives the ignorant the power to seem more knowledgeable than an expert to a group.

== On Non-Existence ==
Gorgias is the author of a lost work: On Nature or the Non-Existent (also On Non-Existence). Rather than being one of his rhetorical works, it presented a theory of being that at the same time refuted and parodied the Eleatic thesis. The original text was lost and today there remain just two paraphrases of it. The first is preserved by the Pyrrhonist philosopher Sextus Empiricus in Against the Logicians and the other by Pseudo-Aristotle, the author of On Melissus, Xenophanes, and Gorgias. Each work, however, excludes material that is discussed in the other, which suggests that each version may represent intermediary sources (Consigny 4). It is clear, however, that the work developed a skeptical argument, which has been extracted from the sources and translated as below:

1. Nothing exists;
2. Even if something exists, nothing can be known about it; and
3. Even if something can be known about it, knowledge about it can't be communicated to others.
4. Even if it can be communicated, it cannot be understood.

The argument has largely been seen as an ironic refutation of Parmenides' thesis on Being. Gorgias set out to prove that it is as easy to demonstrate that being is one, unchanging and timeless as it is to prove that being has no existence at all. Regardless of how it "has largely been seen" it seems clear that Gorgias was focused instead on the notion that true objectivity is impossible since the human mind can never be separated from its possessor.

"How can anyone communicate the idea of color by means of words since the ear does not hear colors but only sounds?" This quote was used to show his theory that 'there is nothing', 'if there were anything no one would know it', 'and if anyone did know it, no one could communicate it'. This theory, thought of in the late 5th century BC, is still being contemplated by many philosophers throughout the world. This argument has led some to label Gorgias a nihilist (one who believes nothing exists, or that the world is incomprehensible, and that the concept of truth is fictitious).

For the first main argument where Gorgias says, "there is no-thing", he tries to persuade the reader that thought and existence are not the same. By claiming that if thought and existence truly were the same, then everything that anyone thought would suddenly exist. He also attempted to prove that words and sensations could not be measured by the same standards, for even though words and sensations are both derived from the mind, they are essentially different. This is where his second idea comes into place.

== Rhetorical works ==
=== Encomium of Helen ===
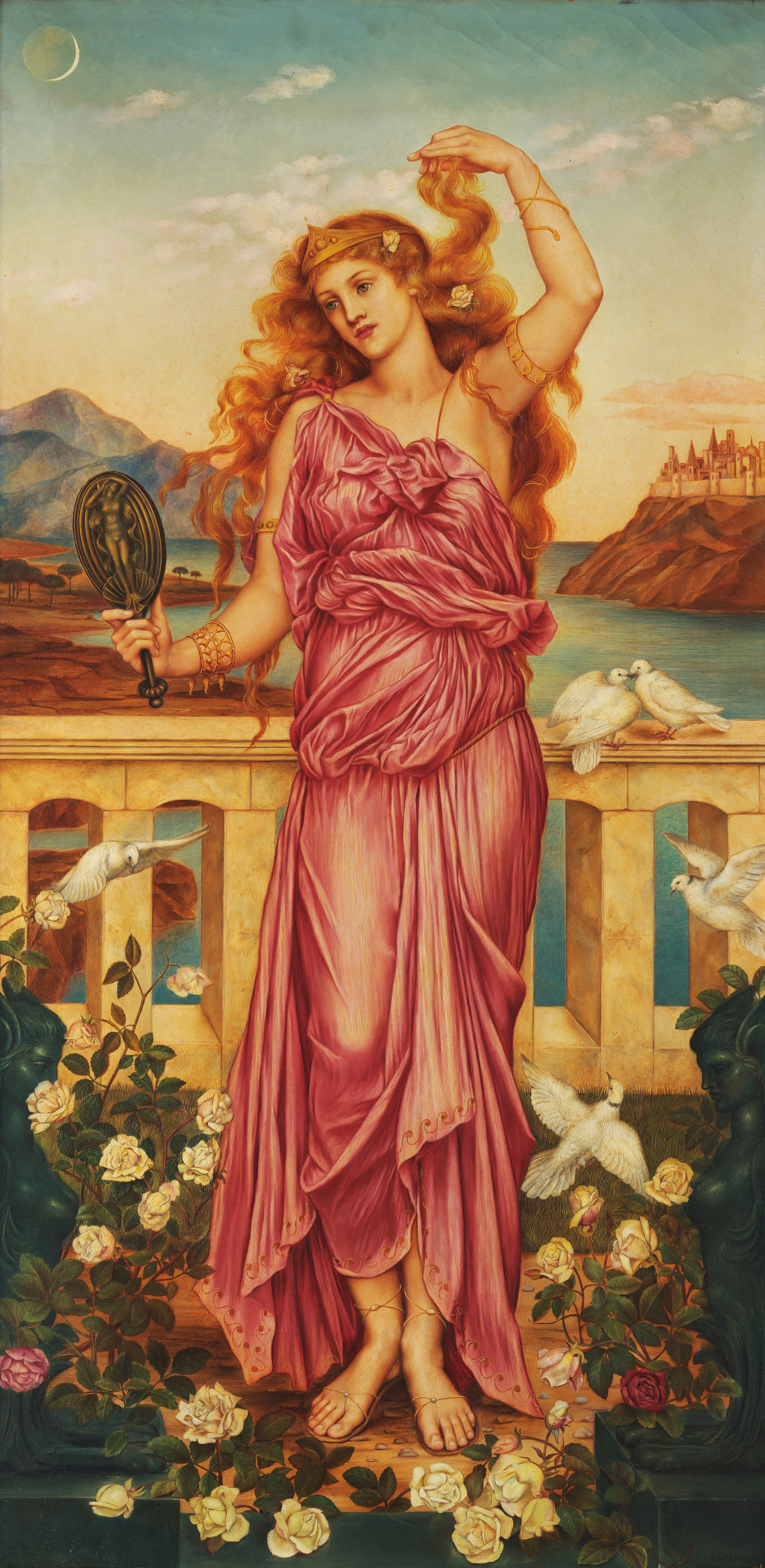
Helen of Troy by Evelyn De Morgan (1898, London)

The Encomium of Helen is considered to be a good example of epideictic oratory and was supposed to have been Gorgias' "show piece or demonstration piece," which was used to attract students (Matsen, Rollinson and Sousa, 33). In their writings, Gorgias and other sophists speculated "about the structure and function of language" as a framework for expressing the implications of action and the ways decisions about such actions were made" (Jarratt 103). And this is exactly the purpose of Gorgias' Encomium of Helen. Of the three divisions of rhetoric discussed by Aristotle in his Rhetoric (forensic, deliberative, and epideictic), the Encomium can be classified as an epideictic speech, expressing praise for Helen of Troy and ridding her of the blame she faced for leaving Sparta with Paris (Wardy 26).

Helen – the proverbial "Helen of Troy" – exemplified both sexual passion and tremendous beauty for the Greeks. She was the daughter of Zeus and Leda, the Queen of Sparta, and her beauty was seen by the Trojans as the direct cause of the decade long Trojan War between Greece and Troy. The war began after the goddesses Hera, Athena, and Aphrodite asked Paris (a Trojan prince) to select who was the most beautiful of the three. Each goddess tried to influence Paris' decision, but he ultimately chose Aphrodite who then promised Paris the most beautiful woman. Paris then traveled to Greece where he was greeted by Helen and her husband Menelaus. Under the influence of Aphrodite, Helen allowed Paris to persuade her to elope with him. Together they traveled to Troy, not only sparking the war, but also a popular and literary tradition of blaming Helen for her wrongdoing. It is this tradition which Gorgias confronts in the Encomium.

The Encomium opens with Gorgias explaining that "a man, woman, speech, deed, city or action that is worthy of praise should be honored with acclaim, but the unworthy should be branded with blame" (Gorgias 30). In the speech Gorgias discusses the possible reasons for Helen's journey to Troy. He explains that Helen could have been persuaded in one of four ways: by the gods, by physical force, by love, or by speech (logos). If it were indeed the plan of the gods that caused Helen to depart for Troy, Gorgias argues that those who blame her should face blame themselves, "for a human's anticipation cannot restrain a god's inclination" (Gorgias 31). Gorgias explains that, by nature, the weak are ruled by the strong, and, since the gods are stronger than humans in all respects, Helen should be freed from her undesirable reputation. If, however, Helen was abducted by force, it is clear that the aggressor committed a crime. Thus, it should be he, not Helen, who should be blamed. And if Helen was persuaded by love, she should also be rid of ill repute because "if love is a god, with the divine power of the gods, how could a weaker person refuse and reject him? But if love is a human sickness and a mental weakness, it must not be blamed as mistake, but claimed as misfortune" (Gorgias 32). Finally, if speech persuaded Helen, Gorgias claims he can easily clear her of blame. Gorgias explains: "Speech is a powerful master and achieves the most divine feats with the smallest and least evident body. It can stop fear, relieve pain, create joy, and increase pity" (Gorgias 31). It is here that Gorgias compares the effect of speech on the mind with the effect of drugs on the body. He states that Helen has the power to "lead" many bodies in competition by using her body as a weapon (Gumpert, 74). This image of "bodies led and misled, brought together and led apart, is of paramount importance in Gorgias' speech," (Gumpert, 74).

While Gorgias primarily used metaphors and paradox, he famously used "figures of speech, or schemata" (Matsen, Rollinson and Sousa). This included balanced clauses (isocolon), the joining of contrasting ideas (antithesis), the structure of successive clauses (parison), and the repetition of word endings (homoeoteleuton) (Matsen, Rollinson and Sousa, 33). The Encomium shows Gorgias' interest in argumentation, as he makes his point by "systematically refuting a series of possible alternatives," (Matsen, Rollinson and Sousa, 33). It is an encomium of the "rhetorical craft itself, and a demonstration of its power over us," (Gumpert, 73). According to Van Hook, The Encomium of Helen abounds in "amplification and brevity, a rhythm making prose akin to poetry, bold metaphors and poetic or unusual epithets" (122).

=== Defense of Palamedes ===
In the Defense of Palamedes Gorgias describes logos as a positive instrument for creating ethical arguments (McComiskey 38). The Defense, an oration that deals with issues of morality and political commitment (Consigny 38), defends Palamedes who, in Greek mythology, is credited with the invention of the alphabet, written laws, numbers, armor, and measures and weights (McComiskey 47).

In the speech Palamedes defends himself against the charge of treason. In Greek mythology, Odysseus – in order to avoid going to Troy with Agamemnon and Menelaus to bring Helen back to Sparta – pretended to have gone mad and began sowing the fields with salt. When Palamedes threw Odysseus' son, Telemachus, in front of the plow, Odysseus avoided him, demonstrating that he was sane. Odysseus, who never forgave Palamedes for making him reveal himself, later accused Palamedes of betraying the Greeks to the Trojans. Soon after, Palamedes was condemned and killed (Jarratt 58).

In this epideictic speech, like the Encomium, Gorgias is concerned with experimenting with how plausible arguments can cause conventional truths to be doubted (Jarratt 59). Throughout the text, Gorgias presents a method for composing logical (logos), ethical (ethos) and emotional (pathos) arguments from possibility, which are similar to those described by Aristotle in Rhetoric. These types of arguments about motive and capability presented in the Defense are later described by Aristotle as forensic topoi. Gorgias demonstrates that in order to prove that treason had been committed, a set of possible occurrences also need to be established. In the Defense these occurrences are as follows: communication between Palamedes and the enemy, exchange of a pledge in the form of hostages or money, and not being detected by guards or citizens. In his defense, Palamedes claims that a small sum of money would not have warranted such a large undertaking and reasons that a large sum of money, if indeed such a transaction had been made, would require the aid of many confederates in order for it to be transported. Palamedes reasons further that such an exchange could neither have occurred at night because the guards would be watching, nor in the day because everyone would be able to see. Palamedes continues, explaining that if the aforementioned conditions were, in fact, arranged then action would need to follow. Such action needed to take place either with or without confederates; however, if these confederates were free men then they were free to disclose any information they desired, but if they were slaves there was a risk of their voluntarily accusing to earn freedom, or accusing by force when tortured. Slaves, Palamedes says, are untrustworthy. Palamedes goes on to list a variety of possible motives, all of which he proves false.

Through the Defense Gorgias demonstrates that a motive requires an advantage such as status, wealth, honour, and security, and insists that Palamedes lacked a motive (McComiskey 47–49).

=== Epitaphios (or the Athenian funeral oration) ===
This text is considered to be an important contribution to the genre of epitaphios. During the 5th and 4th centuries BC, such funeral orations were delivered by well-known orators during public burial ceremonies in Athens, whereby those who died in wars were honoured. Gorgias' text provides a clever critique of 5th century propagandist rhetoric in imperial Athens and is the basis for Plato's parody, Menexenus (Consigny 2).

== Reception and legacy ==
=== In antiquity ===
Plato was one of Gorgias' greatest critics and a student of Socrates. Plato's dislike for sophistic doctrines is well known, and it is in his eponymous dialogue that both Gorgias himself as well as his rhetorical beliefs are ridiculed (McComiskey 17).

In his dialogue Gorgias, Plato distinguishes between philosophy and rhetoric, characterizing Gorgias as a shallow, opportunistic orator who entertains his audience with his eloquent words and who believes that it is unnecessary to learn the truth about actual matters when one has discovered the art of persuasion. In the dialogue, Gorgias responds to one of Socrates' statements as follows: "Rhetoric is the only area of expertise you need to learn. You can ignore all the rest and still get the better of the professionals!" (Plato 24).

Gorgias, whose On Non-Existence is taken to be critical of the Eleatic tradition and its founder Parmenides, describes philosophy as a type of seduction, but he does not deny philosophy entirely, giving some respect to philosophers.

Plato answers Gorgias by reaffirming the Parmenidean ideal that being is the basic substance and reality of which all things are composed, insisting that philosophy is a dialectic distinct from and superior to rhetoric (Wardy 52).

Aristotle also criticizes Gorgias, labeling him a mere Sophist whose primary goal is to make money by appearing wise and clever, thus deceiving the public by means of misleading or sophistic arguments.

Despite these negative portrayals, Gorgias's style of rhetoric was highly influential. Gorgias's Defense of Helen influenced Euripides's Helen and his Defense of Palamedes influenced the development of western dicanic argument, including possibly even Plato's version of the Apology of Socrates.

=== Modern reception ===
For almost all of western history, Gorgias has been a marginalized and obscure figure in both philosophical thought and culture at large. In the nineteenth century, however, writers such as the German philosopher Georg Wilhelm Friedrich Hegel (1770–1831) and the English classicist George Grote (1794–1871) began to work to "rehabilitate" Gorgias and the other Sophists from their longstanding reputation as unscrupulous charlatans who taught people how to persuade others using rhetoric for unjust causes. As early as 1872, the English philosopher Henry Sidgwick (1838–1900) was already calling this the "old view". Modern sources continue to affirm that the old stereotype of the Sophists is not accurate.

Since the late twentieth century, scholarly interest in Gorgias has increased dramatically and the amount of research conducted on him is even beginning to rival the research on his more traditionally popular contemporary Parmenides. Gorgias's distinctive writing style, filled with antithesis and figurative language, has been seen as foreshadowing the later development of Menippean satire, as well as, in more recent times, the mannerist, grotesque, and carnivalesque genres. Several scholars have even argued that Gorgias's thoughts on the nature of knowledge, language, and truth foreshadow the views of modern philosophers such as Martin Heidegger, Jacques Derrida, Ludwig Wittgenstein, A. J. Ayer, Amélie Rorty, and Stanley Fish. Nonetheless, many academic philosophers still ridicule any efforts to portray Gorgias as a serious thinker.

== See also ==
- Hellenistic philosophy
- On Melissus, Xenophanes, and Gorgias
