= The Common Topics =

In classical rhetoric, the Common Topics (koinoi topoi)were a short list of four traditional topics regarded as suitable to structure an argument.

In Aristotle's Rhetoric, the common topics are discussed in Book II. They are generally considered to be heuristic.

== Four traditional topics ==
1. Past Fact (Circumstance)
2. Possible/Impossible (Possibility)
3. Future Fact (Circumstance)
4. Greater/Lesser (Comparison)

== Expanded list of topics ==
Edward P.J. Corbett and Robert J. Connors expanded the list in their 1971 book Classical Rhetoric for the Modern Student to include:

- Definition
  - genus / division / species
  - etymology
  - description
  - definition
  - example
  - synonyms
- Comparison
  - similarity
  - difference
  - degree
- Circumstance
  - cause and effect
  - timing
- Relationship
  - contraries
  - exclusion
- Testimony
  - statistics
  - maxims
  - law
  - precedents
  - personal example
  - historical example
  - authoritative quotes

== See also ==
- Rhetoric (Aristotle)
