= Juan Luis Vives =

Spanish humanist scholar (1493–1540)

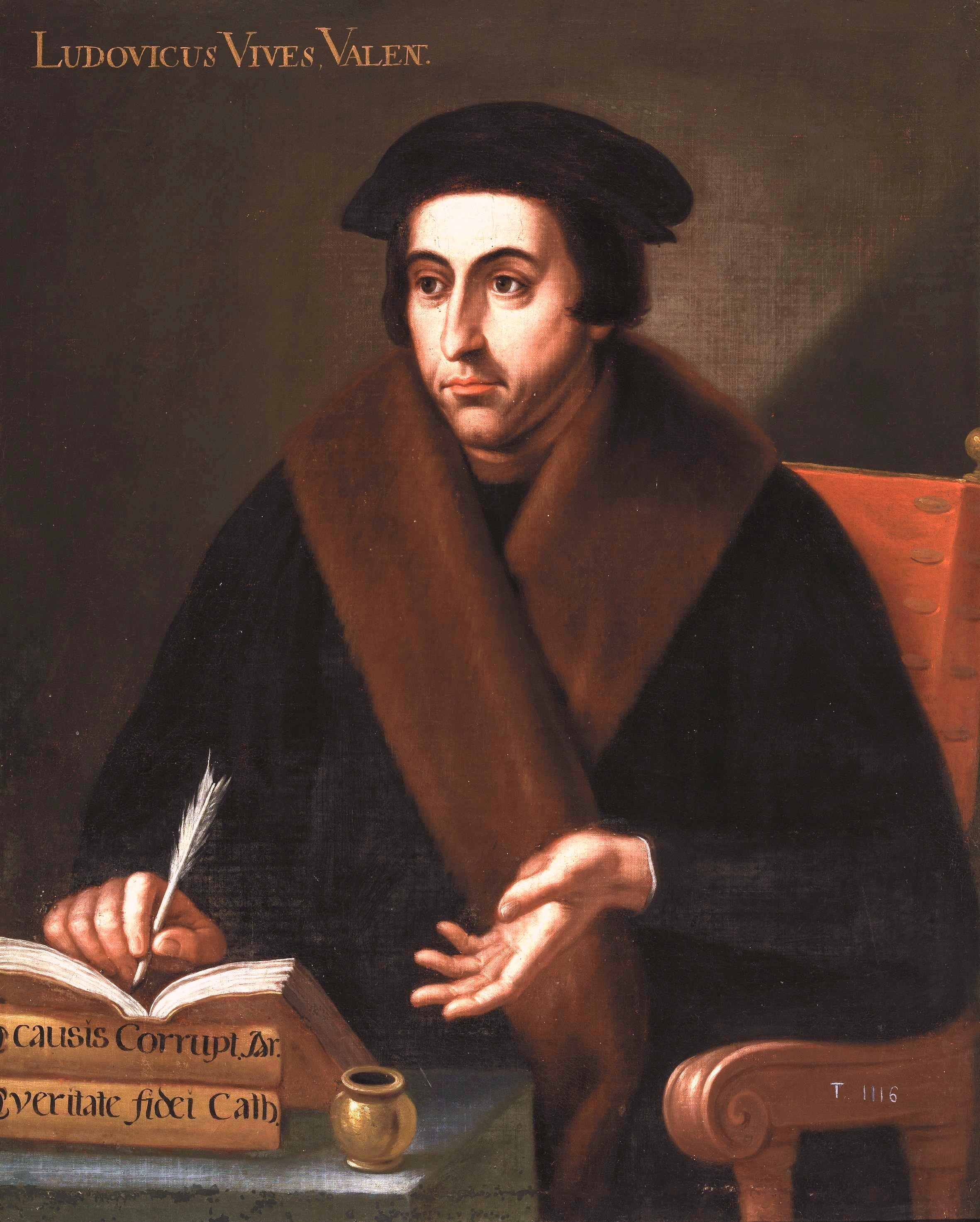
- Anonymous portrait of Juan Luis Vives, Museo del Prado
- Born: Juan Luis Vives y March; 6 March 1493; Valencia, Crown of Aragon
- Died: 6 May 1540 (aged 47); Bruges, Burgundian Netherlands

Education
- Education: University of Paris
- Academic advisor: Erasmus

Philosophical work
- Era: Renaissance philosophy
- Region: Western philosophy
- School: Renaissance humanism
- Institutions: University of Leuven; Corpus Christi College, Oxford
- Main interests: Psychology, education
- Notable ideas: Study of the psyche

Signature
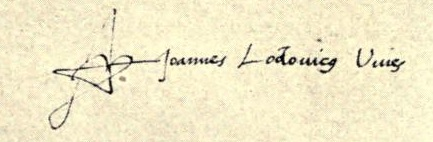

Juan Luis Vives y March (Spanish: [ˈbiβes]; Latin: Joannes Ludovicus Vives; Catalan: Joan Lluís Vives i March; Dutch: Jan Ludovicus Vives; 6 March 1493 – 6 May 1540) was a Spanish (Valencian) scholar and Renaissance humanist who spent most of his adult life in the southern Habsburg Netherlands. His beliefs on the soul, insight into early medical practice, and perspective on emotions, memory and learning earned him the title of the "father of modern psychology". Vives was the first to shed light on some key ideas that established how psychology is perceived today.

The text on his grave said:

Hier is begraven meester Jan Ludovicus Vives

geboren van Valencia in spagnien

hie overleet

anno MDXL den VI in meye

== Early life ==
Luis Vives was born in Valencia to a converso family that had converted from Judaism to Christianity; on his mother's side the conversion occurred several decades before the Alhambra Decree.

While still in Spain, he attended the University of Valencia (Estudi General), where he was taught by Jerome Amiguetus and Daniel Siso. Vives later recalled that the school was dominated by scholasticism, with the dialectic and disputation playing a central role in delivering of education. He wrote:

Even the youngest scholars are accustomed never to keep silence; they are always asserting vigorously whatever comes uppermost to their minds, lest they should seem to be giving up the dispute. Nor does one disputation, or even two a day prove sufficient, as for instance at dinner. They wrangle at breakfast; they wrangle after breakfast; they wrangle before supper and they wrangle after supper. At home they dispute, out of doors they dispute. They wrangle over their food, in the bath, in the sweating room, in the church, in the town, in the country, in public, in private. At all times they are wrangling.

His mother, Blanquina, born in 1473, was investigated by the Inquisition for being a Marrano and a Judaizer in 1491. She admitted that when she was nine her mother had insisted that the family continue to observe Yom Kippur. Upon demonstrating that she was able and willing to recite the Nicene Creed, she was acquitted. She died of the plague in 1508, when Vives was 15 years old; in 1509 he left Spain never to return.

Around 1524, Vives' father, grandmother, and great-grandfather, as well as several other members of their wider family, were convicted and executed by the Inquisition for Crypto-Judaism, after his uncle was caught hosting a secret synagogue inside his house.

A few years later (c. 1528), allegedly to avoid providing doweries to Vives' sisters, local authorities brought up their mother's heresy investigation once again. Based on her own Yom Kippur testimony, Blanquina Vives' corpse was exhumed and burned at the stake. Even though his own belief in Roman Catholicism was genuine, Vives was living at the time in Thomas More's house in Chelsea and entered a severe depressive state.

== Academic career ==
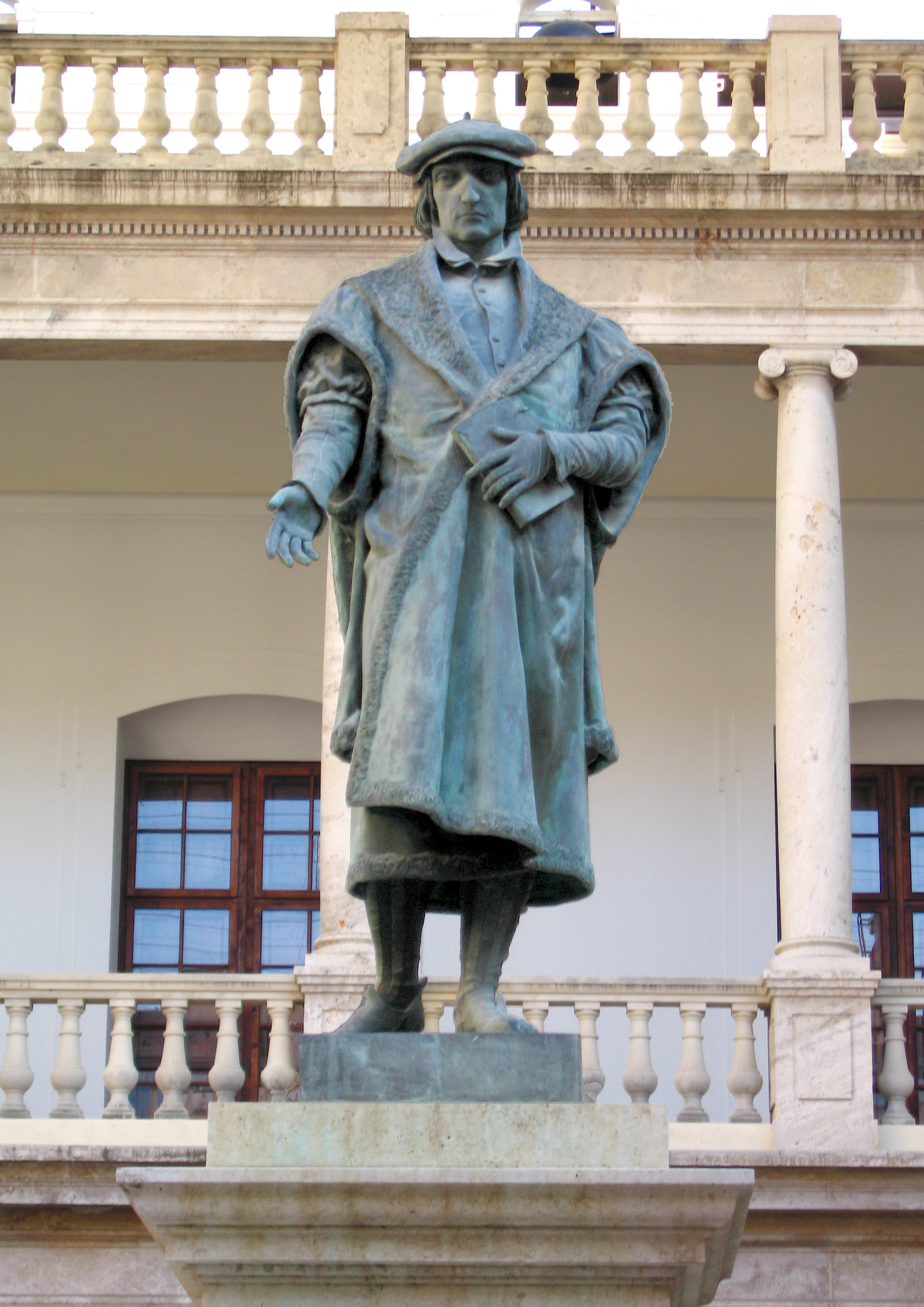
Statue of Juan Luis Vives at the cloister of the University of Valencia, by Josep Aixa Íñigo

Vives studied at the University of Paris from 1509 to 1512, and in 1519 was appointed professor of humanities at the University of Leuven. At the insistence of his friend Erasmus, he prepared an elaborate commentary on Augustine's De Civitate Dei, which was published in 1522 with a dedication to Henry VIII of England. Soon afterwards, he was invited to England, and acted as tutor to the Princess Mary, for whose use he wrote De ratione studii puerilis epistolae duae (1523) and, ostensibly, De Institutione Feminae Christianae, on Christian education for young women and which Vives dedicated to Queen Catherine of Aragon.

While in England, he resided at Corpus Christi College, Oxford, where Erasmus had strong ties. Vives was made doctor of laws and lectured on philosophy. Once he sided in 1528 with his patroness and openly declared himself against the annulment of the marriage between Henry VIII and Catherine of Aragon, Vives immediately fell from royal favour and was confined to his house for six weeks.

== Later life ==
On his release, he returned to Bruges, where he devoted the rest of his life to the composition of numerous ethical and philosophical writings, chiefly directed against the unquestioning authority of scholasticism within some circles, and of Aristotle in others. The most important of his treatises is the De Causis Corruptarum Artium, which has been ranked with Bacon's Novum Organon.

His most important pedagogic work are Introductio ad sapientiam (1524); De disciplinis, which stressed the urgent importance of more rational programs of education and studying; De prima philosophia; and the Exercitatio linguae latinae, which is a Latin textbook consisting of a series of brilliant dialogues. His philosophical works include De anima et vita (1538), De veritate fidei Christianae; and "De Subventione Pauperum Sive de Humanis Necessitatibus" (On Assistance To The Poor) (1526), the first tract of its kind in the Western world to treat the problem of urban poverty and propose concrete suggestions for a State policy of poverty relief and reduction. Vives detected through philological analysis that the author of the Letter of Aristeas, which describes the making of the Pre-Christian translation of the Old Testament into Koine Greek as the Septuagint, could not have been a contemporary ethnic Greek but must have been a Jewish writer who lived long after the events he described.

He died in Bruges in 1540, at the age of 47, and was buried in St. Donatian's Cathedral.

== Contemporary relevance ==
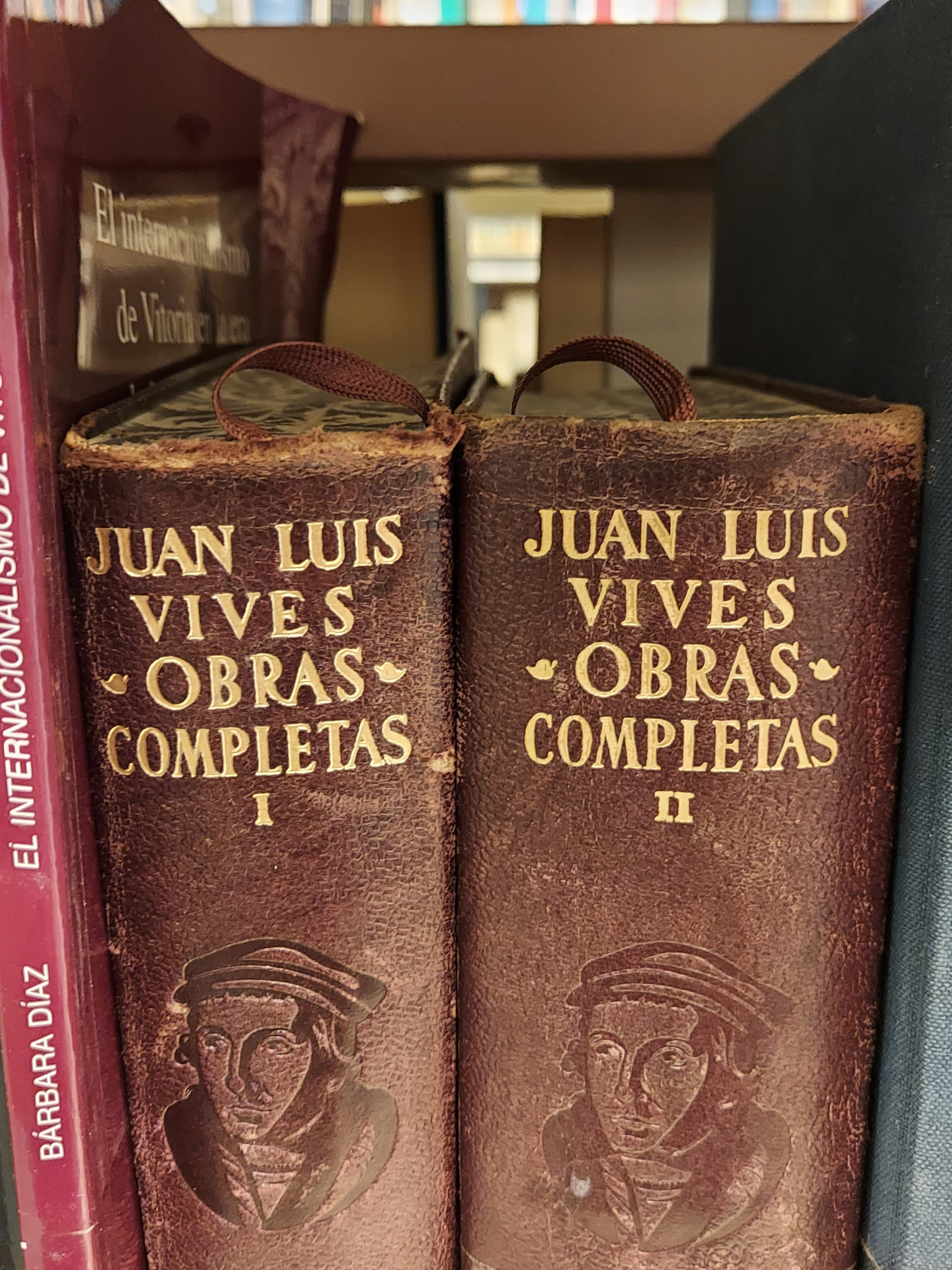
Works of Juan Luis Vives

Vives imagined and described a comprehensive theory of education. He may have directly influenced the essays of Michel Eyquem de Montaigne as well as John Henry Newman. His writings were also admired by his close friends Thomas More and Erasmus, who wrote that Vives "will overshadow the name of Erasmus."

Vives is considered the first scholar to analyze the psyche directly. He did extensive interviews with people, and noted the relation between their exhibition of affect and the particular words they used and the issues they were discussing. While it is unknown if Sigmund Freud was familiar with Vives's work, historian of psychiatry Gregory Zilboorg considered Vives a godfather of psychoanalysis. (A History of Medical Psychology, 1941) and the father of modern psychology by Foster Watson (1915.)

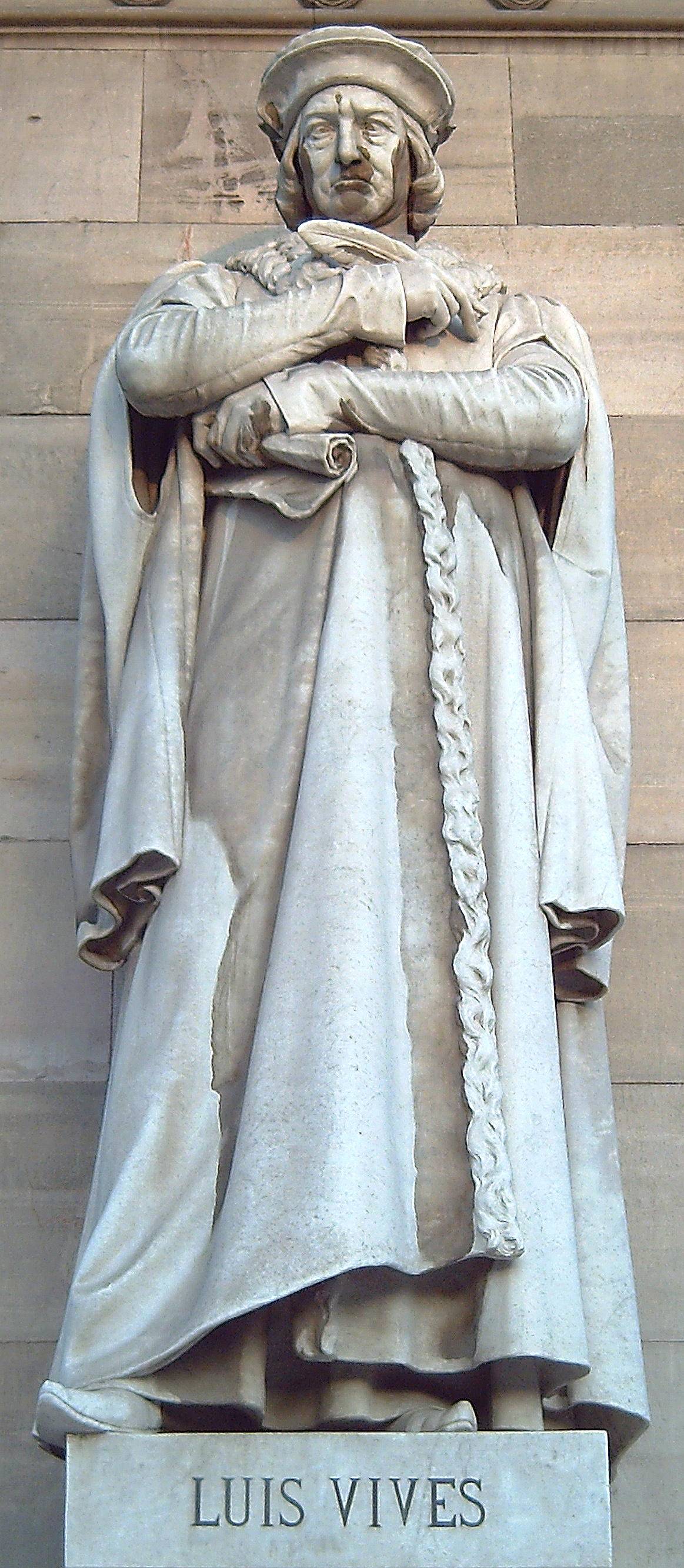
Statue of Juan Luis Vives, by Pere Carbonell (1892), placed at the façade of the National Library of Spain

Vives taught monarchs. His idea of a diverse and concrete children's education long preceded those of Jean Jacques Rousseau, and may have indirectly influenced Rousseau through the essays of Montaigne.

However influential he may have been in the 16th century, Vives now attracts minimal interest beyond specialized academic fields. The values of Vives inspired two Belgian Schools for higher education (KATHO and Katholieke Hogeschool Brugge-Oostende) to choose the name 'Vives' as the name for their cooperation/merger starting from September 2013. Also, the regional link of Vives with the province of West Flanders, of which Bruges is the capital, played a role.

=== State assistance for those in poverty ===
During the Middle Ages, poor relief was usually the responsibility of the Church and individuals through almsgiving. As society became more complex, these efforts became insufficient. In 1525, the Dutch city of Bruges requested Vives to suggest means to address the issue of relief for the poor. He set out his views in his essay De Subventione Pauperum Sive de Humanis Necessitatibus (On Assistance To The Poor). Vives argued that the state had a responsibility to provide some level of financial relief for the poor, as well as craft training for the unskilled poor, but considered that a "right to laziness" doesn't exist.

The city of Bruges did not implement Vives's suggestions until 1557, but his proposals influenced social relief legislation enacted in England, the German Empire and the Spanish Kingdom during the 1530s, despite criticism from other thinkers and theologians.

=== On gender roles and responsibilities ===
Some recent feminist and gender studies scholars have accused Vives of altering classical rhetoric to express a sort of "half-feminism". Among 16th century Spanish Renaissance humanism's numerous "treatises for and against women," some modern scholars have alleged that Vives "steer[ed] a middle path" (pp. xxiv–xxv), neither gynophobic, gynocentric, philogynist, nor misogynist.

At the same time his writings expressed his beliefs in traditional gender roles. For example, he stated that women should not be teachers: "For Adam was created first, then Eve, and Adam was not seduced but the woman was seduced and led astray. Therefore, since woman is a weak creature and of uncertain judgment and is easily deceived (as Eve, the first parent of mankind, demonstrated, whom the devil deluded with such a slight pretext), she should not teach, lest when she has convinced herself of some false opinion, she transmit it to her listeners in her role as a teacher and easily drag others into her error, since pupils willingly follow their teacher." Also, his De institutione feminae christianae, published in 1523, was commissioned by Catherine of Aragon, Spanish Queen consort of Henry VIII of England, for her daughter, Mary. The purpose of the book was to instruct Mary on the proper roles for her to embrace. Ironically, it forbade the very role of Queen regnant, which both Princess Mary and her younger half-sister Elizabeth would later undertake and fulfill: "An unmarried young woman should rarely appear in public . . . who can have respect for a man who he sees is ruled by a woman?"" The book also provides a longer list of attributes for a married Christian woman. She should, according to Vives, be loyal, dedicated, and obedient to her husband within reason; she should choose to dress modestly, covering her face in public; she should never allow any other adult man inside her household without her husband's permission. While a wife's obedience and marital fidelity determined her honor, a husband's honor and respect in the eyes of society stemmed from his ability to be the head of his household without abusing his power, to not be abused, dominated, or controlled by his wife, and to ensure that she remained faithful to their wedding vows.

Vives's text for husbands, De los deberes del marido, fills less than half the length of his advice book for married women and focuses substantially on selecting and governing a good Christian wife rather than detailing how a Christian husband should behave in his own right.

=== Thoughts on the soul ===
Vives expressed an interest in the soul. He believed that understanding how the soul functions is more valuable than understanding the soul itself. "He was not concerned with what the soul is, but rather what the soul was like". Norena explains that Vives thought that the soul had certain characteristics. He believed that the best part of the soul is its ability to "…understand, remember, reason, and judge." Vives touched on the mind in terms of his explanations of the soul—he claims that one cannot simply define what the soul is, but by piecing together parts of it, a better concept of how the soul works can be achieved. He compared the soul to art with an analogy by stating: "How we perceive a painted picture is more telling than declaring what the picture is itself". Vives rejected the deterministic view of human behavior, and said instead that the human mind and soul can "modify our behavior in ethically and socially." He also suggested that the way we feel day to day affects whether our soul is attaining good or evil.

=== Insight on medicine ===
Vives is acknowledged for integrating psychology and medicine. "His ideas were new and they paved the way for other contributions that have greatly impacted our society today in terms of how we view the impact of medicine on humans". He expressed the importance of animal testing before doing so on to people -–"Although Vives did not perform actual medical procedures, his suggestions were among the first of his time." Vives had hopes that his ideas would influence the public. "With time, some may argue that a sort of social reform was created largely due to Vives' ideas on medicine". Clements described Vives' contributions as being "original," yet many would classify him as being very underrated in terms of his accomplishments and ideas. Vives also made important early observations on the health of the human body-—he urged that "Personal habits of cleanliness and temperance greatly impacted health". He claimed that the cleanliness of the body impacts the welfare of the body and the mind. He touched on how to medicate the mentally unstable by saying that mocking, exciting, and irritating those individuals who are mentally ill does not contribute to their treatment. Vives said that "Using the mentally ill as a form of entertainment is one of the most inhumane practices he had ever encountered". His belief was that some individuals who are mentally ill should be provided medication, but others just need friendly treatment.

=== Emotions and the body ===
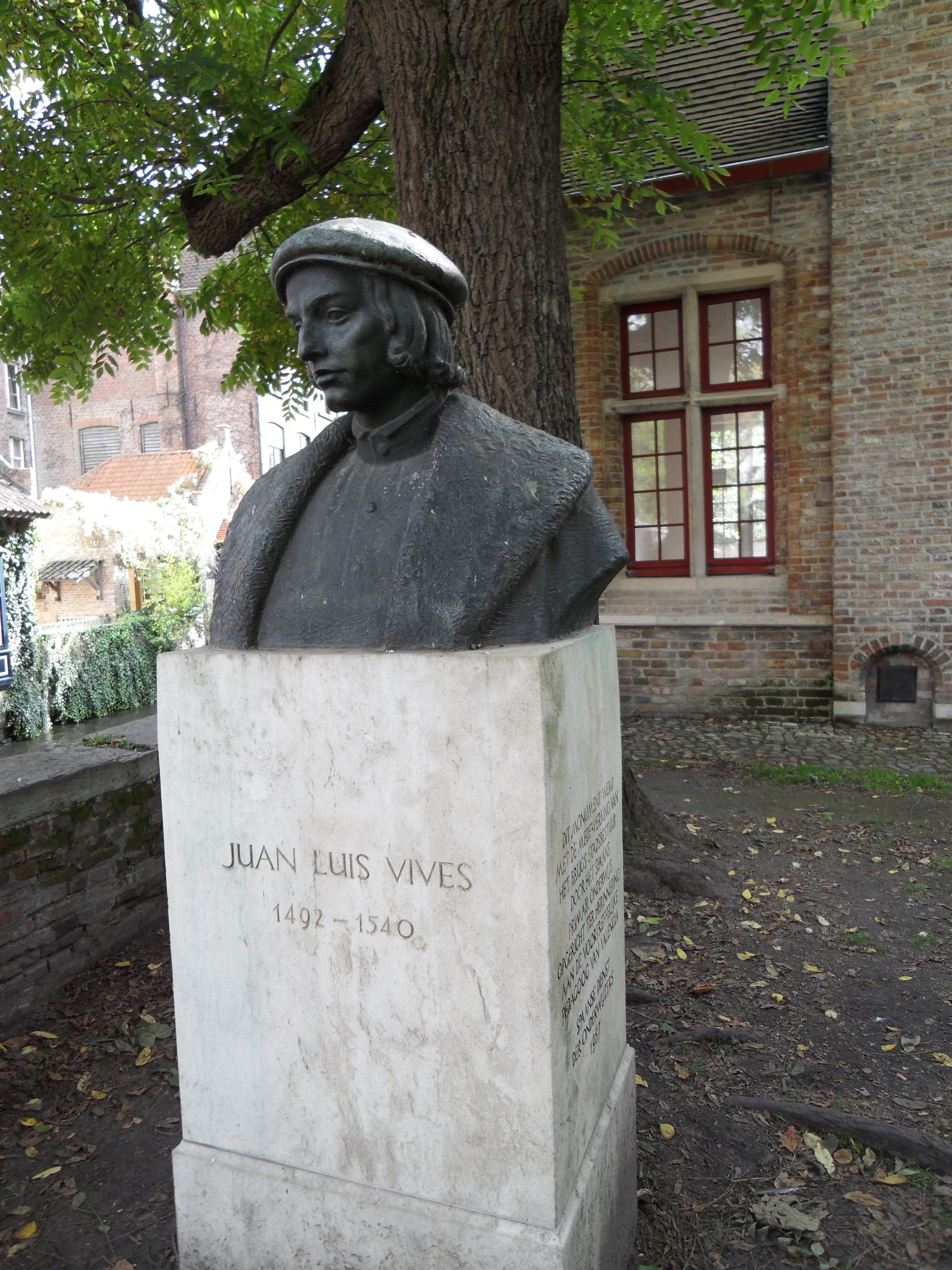
Bust of Juan Luis Vives in Bruges, Belgium

Another psychological contribution from Vives involves his thoughts on emotion. His ideas were largely influenced by the ideologies that came from Galen and Hippocrates in terms of how emotion is related to bile in the body. He agreed with the two with the belief that "different colored biles that humans have reflected different types of emotions". Further, Vives believed that "Certain emotions color bile inside of human bodies and colored bodies likewise influences emotions". According to Norena, Vives followed Galen's recommendations of eating certain types of food for certain types of temperaments. Vives also suggested that almost all of our emotions, even those considered to be negative, are actually beneficial in a lot of ways. He expressed how there is potential to learn and grow from negative emotions as well as positive emotions. His emphasis on animism, or animal spirits, influenced Descartes according to Clements. Vives suggested in his work that the degree in which how strongly a person believes in his or her morals have a great impact on the way they feel about themselves-—"mental strength can influence physical strength". Emotions, according to Vives, can be divided up into "Hot, cold, moist, dry, and varying combinations of the four". Personality disturbances with emotions could be fixed when applying the correct temperature on to the body.

=== Memory ===
Vives placed emphasis on memory. He defined memory as "…relating to the past, while perception relates to the present". "Memory is something that is retained by either externally or internally perceiving it". He especially emphasized how humans imagine something internally and connect it with an event in order to create a memory. This, according to Vives, makes information retrieval of memory easier. He touched on memories in which we are unaware of, otherwise known as the unconscious. He said information is the "Most accessible from memory when a certain amount of attention is given." According to Murray, Vives showed understanding of the modern-day conception of how humans process retrieval. Vives observed that the more a memory is connected to a strong emotional experience, the easier it can be remembered. In terms of retaining memory, imagination was thought to play a key role, especially in children. He also believed in a theory that pointed towards the fact that memory can be improved with practice. He advised that "One should memorize something every day, even a useless quotation." Vives even touched on childhood memory-—he believed that children learn quickly because their mind is less cluttered with worries that adult minds have. Vives also believed that recall of memory is brought about by a concept in which the soul processes the memory. Vives himself had a recall experience as a child where he ate cherries when he had a fever. When he had cherries again as an adult, he "felt as though he was sick just as he was when he was a child." He found this remarkable and determined that memory can exist unconsciously for a very long time. He also believed that "memory declines every day that the mind is not exercised."

=== Learning ===
Vives used the word "intelligence" in a way that can be translated to the word "supervisor" as we know its meaning today: intelligence, according to Vives, involves functions directing attention from different kinds of stimulus. Intelligence is very much a cognitive structure according to Vives. When we learn, the memory of the experience is locked in an order of the actual intelligence. Vives' perception on intelligence is that it is only important when it is put to use. Having an intelligent gift is only meaningful when the person is actively exercising it. The exercising of intelligence is important in retaining memory, which creates a better learning experience in general. Vives was among the first to suggest that the health of a student, the personality of the teacher, the classroom environment and the types of authors that the students are required to read from are all very important in how the student learns. "Vives placed special stress upon the proper environment of the school as the first ecological ingredient of the child's sense experience." He compared learning and gaining knowledge to how humans digest food. Feeding the mind with knowledge is the same as feeding the body with food; it is essential to the human being.

== Major works ==
- Opuscula varia (1519), collection of small works include Vives' first philosophical works, De initiis, sectis et laudibus philosophiae.
- Adversus pseudodialecticos (1520)
- De ratione studii puerilis (1523)
- De institutione feminae christianae (1524). Dedicated to Catherine of Aragon.
- Introductio ad sapientiam (1524)
- Satellitium sive symbola (1524)
- De subventione pauperum. Sive de humanis necessitatibus libri II (1525). Deals with the problem of poverty.
- De Europae dissidiis et Republica (1526)
- De Europae dissidiis et bello Turcico (1526)
- De conditione vitae Christianorum sub Turca (1526)
- De concordia et discordia in humano genere (1529)
- De pacificatione (1529)
- Quam misera esset vita Christianorum sub Turca (1529)
- De disciplinis libri XX (1531). An encyclopedical work, divided into three parts: De causis corruptarum artium, De tradendis disciplinis and De artibus. Also includes De prima philosophia seu de intimo opificio Naturae, De explanatione cuiusque essentiae, De censura veri, De instrumento probabilitatis, and De disputatione.
- De consultatione liber unus (1533). A work on deliberative rhetoric.
- In quartum rhetoricorum ad Herennium praelectio (1533). An introduction to the Rhetoric to Herennius.
- De ratione dicendi (1533). A unique approach to rhetoric.
- De conscribendis epistolis (1534). A treatise on letter writing.
- De anima et vita (1538)
- Linguae Latinae exercitatio (1538)
- De Europae statu ac tumultibus. A mediation addressing to the Pope to ask peace between the Christian princes.
- De veritate fidei Christianae (1543)

== See also ==
- Vives Network
