= Corax of Syracuse =

5th-century BC Greek rhetorician

Corax (Greek: Κόραξ, Korax; fl. 5th century BC) was one of the founders (along with Tisias) of ancient Greek rhetoric. Some scholars contend that both founders are merely legendary personages, others that Corax and Tisias were the same person, described in one fragment as "Tisias, the Crow" (corax is ancient Greek for "crow"). And according to Aristotle, Empedocles was the actual founder of rhetoric, but this is also unlikely. It is believed that William Shakespeare derived the name Sycorax from Corax of Syracuse. Corax is said to have lived in Sicily, Magna Graecia, in the 5th century BC, when Thrasybulus, tyrant of Syracuse, was overthrown and a democracy formed.

== Contributions to rhetorical study ==
Corax originated some of the basic principles and laid the groundwork for the Greek scholars to follow – particularly Socrates, Plato, and Aristotle. They took these properties and applied them to other rhetorical uses, particularly in government. However, Corax developed these methods specifically for the law court, not the assembly.

Under the Deinomenids, the land and property of many common citizens had been seized; these people flooded the courts in an attempt to recover their property. Corax devised an art of rhetoric to permit ordinary men to make their cases in the courts. His chief contribution was in helping structure judicial speeches into various parts: proem, narration, statement of arguments, refutation of opposing arguments, and summary. This structure is the basis for all later rhetorical theory. His pupil Tisias is said to have developed legal rhetoric further, and may have been the teacher of Isocrates. As in the case of Socrates, all we know of the work of Corax is from references made by later writers, such as Plato, Aristotle, and Cicero. He never wrote any of his teachings himself; they were all recorded and published by his pupil, Tisias.

Various rhetorical treatises record a story of how Tisias tried to cheat his teacher. According to this tale, Tisias convinced Corax to waive his customary teacher's fee until Tisias won his first lawsuit; however, Tisias conspicuously avoided going to court. Corax then sued Tisias for the fee, arguing that if Corax won the case, he would get his pay, but if Tisias won (his first lawsuit) he would then have to fulfil the terms of their original agreement. Some versions of the tale end here. Others attribute a counterargument to Tisias: that if he lost the case, he would escape paying under the terms of the original agreement (having not yet won a lawsuit), and if he won there would still be no penalty, since he would be awarded the money at issue. At this point, the judge throws both of them out of court, remarking "κακοῦ κόρακος κακὸν ᾠόν" ("a bad egg from a bad crow").

== Logic ==
Corax is probably best known for developing the "reverse-probability argument", also known as the Art of Corax. If a person is accused of a crime which he is not likely to have committed (for example, a small man physically attacking a large man, against whom he is almost certainly doomed to fail), his defense will be that it is unlikely that the crime occurred. His argument draws on the lack of means of the accused. However, if a person is accused of a crime which he is likely to have committed (in the case of a larger man attacking a smaller man), he can also use the defense that it is unlikely that he did it, for the very reason that it appears too probable. This man draws on the lack of prospect of getting away unsuspected. It works by anticipating the audience's expectations, and then combatting that expectation with a countermove. This pattern of anticipating and then contradicting an audience's expectation has continued to be a typical move in reverse probability arguments to this day.

Of course, another countermove of this same type can also be employed (it could be argued that the large man could have committed the crime precisely because he thought he would be too obvious a suspect), and then another, and then another. For this reason, the Art of Corax has been labeled a "logical paradox". This method of argumentation has also been called quasi-logical: "it maintains that self-referential logic that is typical of the human mind even if it is circular."
