= Against the Sophists =

Oration by Isocrates

"Against the Sophists" is among the few Isocratic speeches that have survived from Ancient Greece. This polemical text was Isocrates' attempt to define his educational doctrine and to separate himself from the multitudes of other teachers of rhetoric. Isocrates was a sophist, an identity which carried the same level of negative connotation as it does now. Many of the sophistic educators were characterized as deceitful because they were more concerned with making a profit from teaching persuasive trickery than of producing quality orators that would promote Athenian democracy. Isocrates was more concerned with the latter of these objectives and sought to separate himself from these less reputable sophistic teachers. After opening his school around 393 or 392 BC, Isocrates wrote "Against the Sophists" to clearly distinguish his teaching methods from the commonly held view of sophistic education.

== General Analysis ==
=== Isocrates' Criticism of the Sophists ===
Isocrates begins his speech by defining the typical characteristics of most sophist teachers. He makes seven clear accusations about what is wrong with their instructional methods.

1. The first accusation is that sophists make big promises that they cannot fulfill, especially relating to having the ability to teach the virtue and justice.
2. The inconsistency between what the sophists claim to teach and their actual ability is Isocrates’ second point. They claim to teach qualities they do not possess themselves, namely truth, happiness and justice.
3. His third accusation expands this point by demonstrating that despite claiming to teach such invaluable virtues and the wonderful art of oratory, sophists only charge minute prices for the instruction (three or four minae).
4. In Isocrates’ fourth charge he establishes that if these teachers were actually capable of teaching virtue and justice, then they would have no issue trusting their students. Yet they insist on receiving advanced payment for their services, which clearly demonstrates their lack of genuine confidence either in their students or in their own teaching abilities.
5. Isocrates’ fifth accusation connects the sophist's inability to teach oratory correctly and their lack of rhetorical knowledge. He asserts that these sophists do not have enough respect for the art of discourse to actually spend the time studying it thoroughly, and because they lack solid understanding of the art, they teach it incorrectly.
6. Isocrates’ sixth claim condemns the techné pushed by these teachers and states that "they are applying the analogy of an art with hard and fast rules to a creative process" (sec. 12). Isocrates explains how much easier it is to teach a man a few universal rules and rhetorical tricks rather than teaching him to apply the true basis of speech—timeliness (kairos), appropriateness (to prepon), and originality.
7. To justify the importance of distinguishing himself from other sophists, Isocrates’ final accusation proclaims "that the bad repute which results therefrom does not affect the offenders only, but that all the rest of us who are in the same profession share in the opprobrium" (sec. 11). In other words, through their mediocre and deceitful practices, these sophists give a bad reputation to all teachers of oratory.

== Isocrates' teaching principles ==
Despite his intention for Against the Sophists to be written as an outline of his own pedagogical principles, Isocrates only briefly mentions his own style and thought of proper discourse before digressing to other criticisms of the current state of sophistry. There are separate but relatively rare occasions where Isocrates lists his own positive exposition of his philosophy.

In arguing against the rigid form which some sophists apply to the art of oration, Isocrates states that, "oratory is only good if it has the qualities of fitness for the occasion, propriety of style, and originality of treatment..." (sec. 13). He says of his own school of oratorical thought that, as opposed to teaching a rigid form, a proper teacher will instil in his students the ability to speak with fluidity and to improvise in order to speak appropriately for the occasion.

After previously criticizing other teachers for overlooking the importance of the innate ability of their students, Isocrates outlines the conditions necessary for a student to become a good orator. Isocrates says, "the student must not only have the requisite aptitude but he must learn the different kinds of discourse and practise himself in their use" (sec. 17). He goes on to say of the teacher that he, "...must so expound the principles of the art with the utmost possible exactness as to leave out nothing that can be taught" (sec. 17). Isocrates saw these three elements not only as necessary for being a good orator but also for becoming a valuable citizen. He valued the student's contribution, his aptitude and practice, far more than he did the teacher's. However Isocrates believed that a proficient teacher could instill some level of talent.

== Conclusion ==
Against the Sophists ends with Isocrates’ claim that while he cannot teach ethics and create virtuous character (arete), the study of discourse has the nearest potential to develop this capacity in its students. While this is not a particularly conclusive ending to the speech, Isocrates did go on to write the Antidosis in 353 BC, which is a significantly longer speech that expands Isocrates’ thoughts on discourse and its instruction.

== Criticism ==
=== Connections between Against the Sophists and Plato's Gorgias ===
Among many other reasons, scholars have placed Against the Sophists as being written in 393 BC because of its relation to Plato's dialogue, Gorgias. It is assumed that when there are similarities in language found in the two works, Plato is responding to Isocrates. Yun Lee Too highlights specific examples.

When talking about the use of third parties by sophists to handle payment because they do not trust their pupils, Isocrates says, "But men who inculcate virtue and sobriety-is it not absurd if they do not trust in their own students before all others?" (sec. 6). A similarity to this can be found in Plato's Gorgias. While also talking about the mistrust by sophists concerning payment, Socrates says to Callicles, "people who've become good and just, whose injustice has been removed by their teacher and who have come to possess justice should wrong him-something they can't do? Don't you think that's absurd my friend?" (519d). It seems that Plato is echoing Against the Sophists by, "criticising them for demanding deposits against their fees since this undermines their promise to make their students just."

Another similarity in language is found in both Plato's and Isocrates' discussions of the state of the mind or soul necessary for a good orator. Isocrates says of qualities of being a good orator, ""these things, I hold, require much study and are the task of a vigorous and imaginative mind" (sec. 17). Yun Lee Too says that this is what is called Isocrates "doxastic soul" or the soul with an aptitude for determining "doxa", or the common opinion. Plato uses comparable language when he writes Socrates as saying, "I think there's a practice...that a mind given to making hunches takes to, a mind that's bold and naturally clever at dealing with people" (463a). Yun Lee Too posits that Plato evolved Isocrates' "doxastic soul" into Plato's own "stochastic soul", or one with a shrewd ability for guess-work.
