= Isocrates =

Greek rhetorician and writer (436–338 BC)

- Ἰσοκράτης
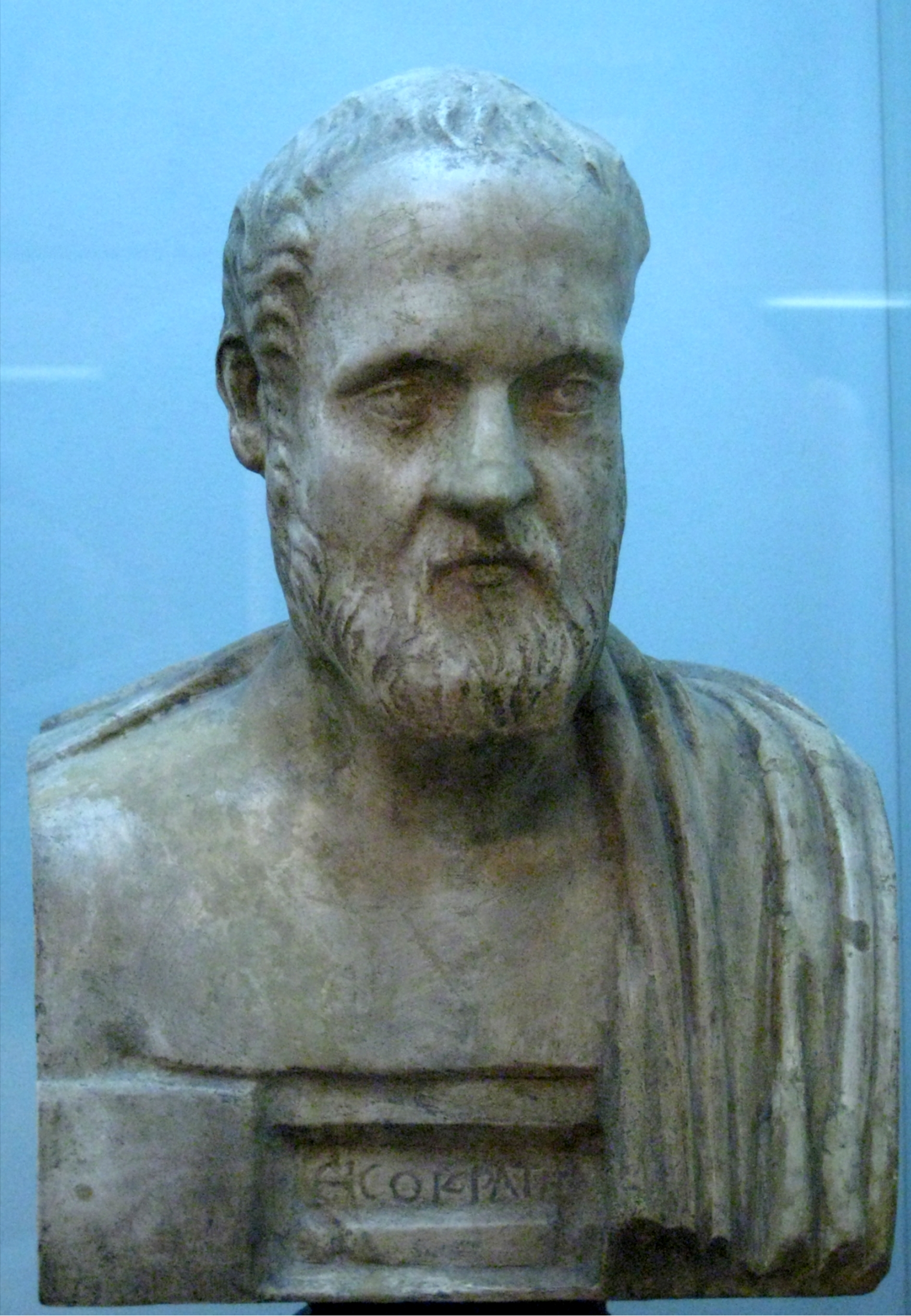
- Bust of Isocrates; plaster cast in the Pushkin Museum of the bust formerly at Villa Albani, Rome
- Born: 436 BC; Athens
- Died: 338 BC (aged 98); Athens
- Occupations: Rhetorician; educator; orator; logographer
- Known for: One of the ten Attic orators; Contributions to classical rhetoric and education; Founding a school of rhetoric at the Lyceum

Isocrates (/aɪˈsɒkrətiːz/; Ancient Greek: Ἰσοκράτης [isokrátɛ̂ːs]; 436–338 BC) was an ancient Greek rhetorician, one of the ten Attic orators. Among the most influential Greek rhetoricians of his time, Isocrates made many contributions to rhetoric and education through his teaching and written works.

Greek rhetoric is commonly traced to Corax of Syracuse, who first formulated a set of rhetorical rules in the fifth century BC. His pupil Tisias was influential in the development of the rhetoric of the courtroom, and by some accounts was the teacher of Isocrates. Within two generations, rhetoric had become an important art, its growth driven by social and political changes such as democracy and courts of law. Isocrates starved himself to death, reportedly out of disappointment with the loss of Greek liberty following the Battle of Chaeronea, two years before his 100th birthday.

Isocrates wrote a number of works calling on the Greeks to unite and invade the Persian empire. He addressed a number of Greek leaders asking them to undertake such a campaign, and later in his life he saw Philip II of Macedon as the ruler who could accomplish this task. He did not live to see the conquest of the Persian empire by Philip's son and successor, Alexander the Great.

== Early life and influences ==
Isocrates was born into a prosperous family in Athens at the height of Athens's power, shortly before the outbreak of the Peloponnesian War (431–404 BC). According to the Suda, a Byzantine-era encyclopedia, Isocrates was the son of Theodorus who owned a workshop that manufactured auloi (a type of musical instrument). His mother's name was Heduto. He had a sister and three brothers; his brothers were named Tisippos, Theomnestos and Theodoros.

Isocrates received a first-rate education. "He is reported to have studied with several prominent teachers, including Tisias (one of the traditional founders of rhetoric), the sophists Prodicus and Gorgias, and the moderate oligarch Theramenes, and to have associated with Socrates, but these reports may reflect later views of his intellectual roots more than historical fact".

He passed his youth in a period following the death of Pericles, a time in which "wealth – both public and private – was dissipated, and political decisions were ill-conceived and violent", according to George Cawkwell. Isocrates would have been 14 years old when the democracy voted to kill all the male citizens of the small Thracian city of Scione. There are accounts, including that of Isocrates himself, stating that the Peloponnesian War wiped out his father's estate, and Isocrates was forced to earn a living.

Late in his life, he married a woman named Plathane (daughter of the sophist Hippias) and adopted Aphareus, one of her sons by a previous marriage.

== Career ==
There is no evidence for Isocrates's participation in public life during the Peloponnesian War (431–404). His professional career is said to have begun with logography, i.e. the writing of courtroom speeches for others. Athenian citizens did not hire lawyers; legal procedure required self-representation. Instead, they would hire people like Isocrates to write speeches for them. Isocrates had a great talent for this and he amassed a considerable fortune. According to Pliny the Elder (Natural History VII.30) he could sell a single oration for twenty talents. However, his weak voice (mikrōphonia) meant that he was not himself a good public speaker. He played no direct part in state affairs, but he published many pamphlets which influenced the public and provide significant insight into major political issues of the day. After founding his own school c. 392 BC, Isocrates abandoned judicial affairs entirely and even disparaged the profession of speech-writing.

=== Pedagogy ===
Around 392 BC Isocrates set up his own school of rhetoric at the Lyceum. Prior to Isocrates, teaching consisted of first-generation Sophists, such as Gorgias and Protagoras, walking from town to town as itinerants, who taught any individuals interested in political occupations how to be effective in public speaking. Isocrates encouraged his students to wander and observe public behavior in the city (Athens) to learn through imitation. His students aimed to learn how to serve the city. "At the core of his teaching was an aristocratic notion of arete ("virtue, excellence"), which could be attained by pursuing philosophia – not so much the dialectical study of abstract subjects like epistemology and metaphysics that Plato marked as "philosophy" as the study and practical application of ethics, politics and public speaking". The philosopher Plato (a rival of Isocrates) founded his own academy in response to Isocrates's foundation.

Isocrates accepted no more than nine pupils at a time. Many of them went on to be prominent philosophers, legislators, historians, orators, writers, and military and political leaders. The first students in Isocrates's school were Athenians. However, after he published the Panegyricus in 380 BC, his reputation spread to many other parts of Greece. Some of his students included Isaeus, Lycurgus, Hypereides, Ephorus, Theopompus, Speusippus, and Timotheus. Many of these students remained under the instruction of Isocrates for three to four years. Timotheus had such a great appreciation for Isocrates that he erected a statue at Eleusis and dedicated it to him.

=== Panhellenism and the rise of Philip II ===
In his Panegyricus, written in 380 BC, Isocrates advocated a campaign of all the Greeks under Athenian leadership against Persia. Later, he addressed several Greek leaders calling on them to lead a Greek campaign against Persia: first King Agesilaus of Sparta, then Dionysius I of Syracuse, then Alexander of Pherae, and later possibly King Archidamus of Sparta. In 346 BC, he published his Philippus, calling on Philip II of Macedon to lead the Greeks against the Persians. Scholars have wondered whether Isocrates's letter to Philip in 346 BC had any influence on the king's plans. Most scholars concur that Philip had no intention of leading a Greek invasion of the Persian empire in the years immediately following 346 BC. Isocrates wrote a second letter to Philip in 345 BC admonishing him for putting himself in danger in battle against a northern tribe (during which Philip was wounded) and again urging him to turn his attention to the Persians.

Isocrates saw the conquest of a part of the Persian empire as a means to unify the Greeks by providing them with a common enemy and to "bring the prosperity of Asia across to Europe" (Panegyricus 187–188). He argued that the Greeks had a natural right to rule over the inferior barbarians. He also envisioned the emigration of economically disadvantaged and potentially volatile elements of Greek societies to the conquered territories. Isocrates called for a league of the Greek poleis under a resolute leader to undertake this conquest, not an empire dominated by Macedon. Nevertheless, after Philip's victory over the Athenians, Thebans and their allies at the Battle of Chaeronea in 338 BC, he wrote in his letter to Philip (the authenticity of which has been doubted by some scholars):

a glory unsurpassable and worthy of your past deeds will be yours when you compel the barbarians… to be serfs of the Greeks, and when you shall force the king who is now called Great to do whatever you say. For then there will be nothing left for you except to become a god.

Isocrates did not live to see the conquest of the Persian empire by Philip's son and successor, Alexander the Great. He reportedly starved himself to death four days (or nine days) after the Battle of Chaeronea because of his disappointment with the loss of Greek freedom. J. F. Dobson doubts this report, considering that Philip's victory "gave a possibility of the fulfilment of the hopes which Isocrates had been cherishing for half his life", i.e. the unification of the Greeks and their conquest of Asia. Cawkwell suggests that Isocrates starved himself in the autumn of 338 BC, at the time of the annual burying of the dead, after Philip concluded the Peace of Demades with Athens. Michael Edwards proposes that Isocrates actually chose to die out of frustration with Athens's continued resistance to Philip.

== Philosophy of rhetoric ==
According to George Norlin, Isocrates defined rhetoric as outward feeling and inward thought of not merely expression, but reason, feeling, and imagination. Like most who studied rhetoric before and after him, Isocrates believed it was used to persuade ourselves and others, but also used in directing public affairs. Isocrates described rhetoric as "that endowment of our human nature which raises us above mere animality and enables us to live the civilized life." Isocrates unambiguously defined his approach in the speech "Against the Sophists". This polemic was written to explain and advertise the reasoning and educational principles behind his new school. He promoted broad-based education by speaking against two types of teachers: the Eristics, who disputed about theoretical and ethical matters, and the Sophists, who taught political debate techniques. Also, while Isocrates is viewed by many as being a rhetor and practicing rhetoric, he refers to his study as philosophia—which he claims as his own. "Against the Sophists" is Isocrates's first published work where he gives an account of philosophy. His principal method is to contrast his ways of teaching with Sophism. While Isocrates does not go against the Sophist method of teaching as a whole, he emphasizes his disagreement with bad Sophistic practices.

Isocrates's program of rhetorical education stressed the ability to use language to address practical problems, and he referred to his teachings as more of a philosophy than a school of rhetoric. He emphasized that students needed three things to learn: a natural aptitude which was inborn, knowledge training granted by teachers and textbooks, and applied practices designed by educators. He also stressed civic education, training students to serve the state. Students would practice composing and delivering speeches on various subjects. He considered natural ability and practice to be more important than rules or principles of rhetoric. Rather than delineating static rules, Isocrates stressed "fitness for the occasion," or kairos (the rhetor's ability to adapt to changing circumstances and situations). His school lasted for over fifty years, in many ways establishing the core of liberal arts education as we know it today, including oratory, composition, history, citizenship, culture, and morality.

== Publications ==
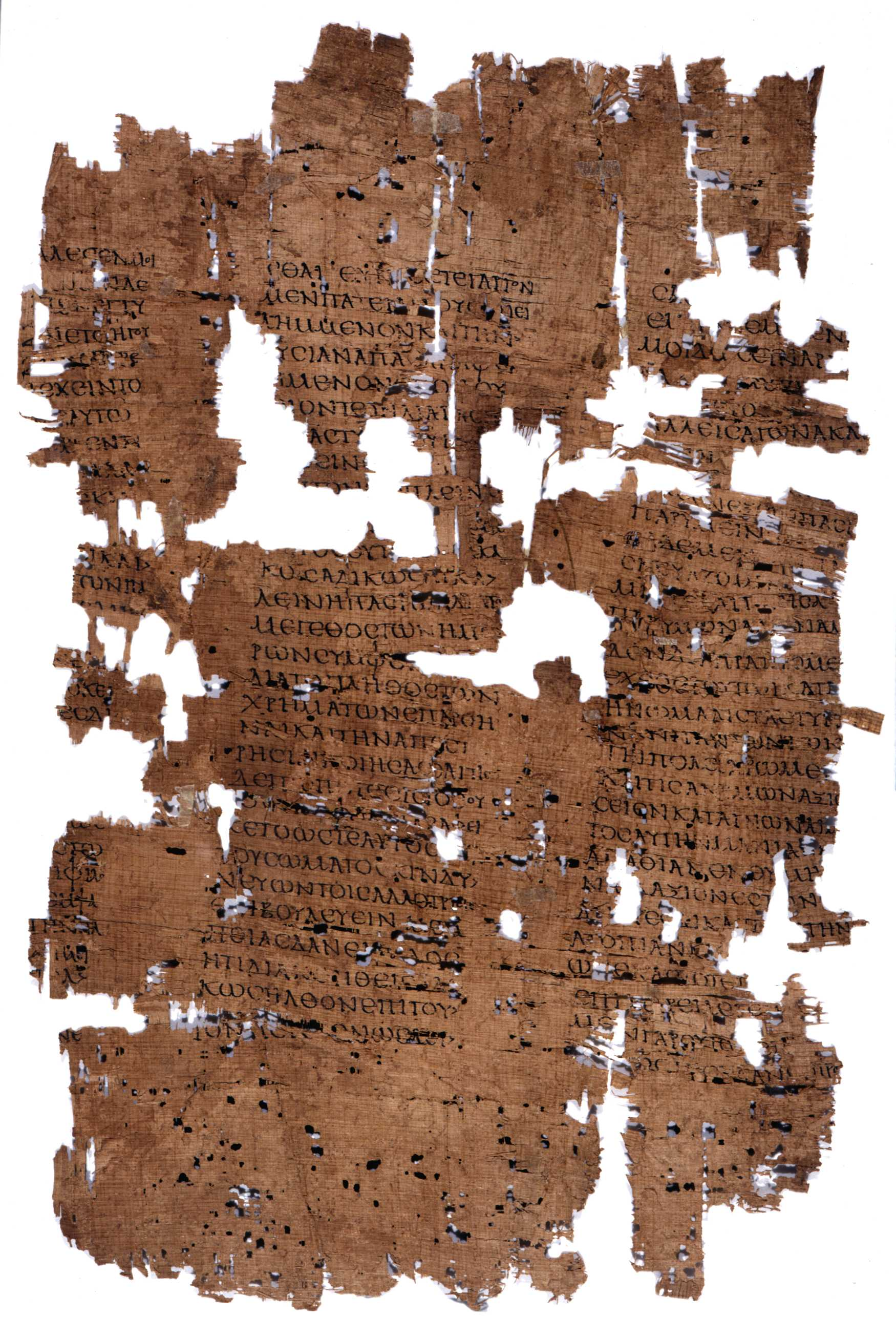
P. Oxy. 1183, late-1st-century-AD papyrus containing Isocrates's Trapeziticus 44–48.

Isokratous Apanta (1570)

Of the 60 orations in his name available in Roman times, 21 remained in transmission by the end of the medieval period. The earliest manuscripts dated from the ninth or tenth century, until fourth century copies of Isocrates's first three orations were found in a single codex during a 1990's excavation at Kellis, a site in the Dakhla Oasis of Egypt. We have nine letters in his name, but the authenticity of four of those has been questioned. He is said to have compiled a treatise, the Art of Rhetoric, but there is no known copy. Other surviving works include his autobiographical Antidosis, and educational texts such as Against the Sophists.

Isocrates wrote a collection of ten known orations, three of which were directed to the rulers of Salamis on Cyprus. In To Nicocles, Isocrates suggests first how the new king might rule best. For the extent of the rest of the oration, Isocrates advises Nicocles of ways to improve his nature, such as the use of education and studying the best poets and sages. Isocrates concludes with the notion that, in finding the happy mean, it is better to fall short than to go to excess. His second oration concerning Nicocles was related to the rulers of Salamis on Cyprus; this was written for the king and his subjects. Isocrates again stresses that the surest sign of good understanding is education and the ability to speak well. The king uses this speech to communicate to the people what exactly he expects of them. Isocrates makes a point in stating that courage and cleverness are not always good, but moderation and justice are. The third oration about Cyprus is an encomium to Euagoras who is the father of Nicocles. Isocrates uncritically applauds Euagoras for forcibly taking the throne of Salamis and continuing rule until his assassination in 374 BC.

Two years after his completion of the three orations, Isocrates wrote an oration for Archidamus, the prince of Sparta. Isocrates considered the settling of the Thebans colonists in Messene a violation of the Peace of Antalcidas. He was bothered most by the fact that this ordeal would not restore the true Messenians but rather the Helots, in turn making these slaves masters. Isocrates believed justice was most important, which secured the Spartan laws but he did not seem to recognize the rights of the Helots. Ten years later Isocrates wrote a letter to Archidamus, now the king of Sparta, urging him to reconcile the Greeks, stopping their wars with each other so that they could end the insolence of the Persians.

At the end of the Social War in 355 BC, 80-year-old Isocrates wrote an oration addressed to the Athenian assembly entitled On the Peace; Aristotle called it On the Confederacy. Isocrates wrote this speech for the reading public, asking that both sides be given an unbiased hearing. Those in favour of peace have never caused misfortune, while those embracing war lurched into many disasters. Isocrates criticized the flatterers who had brought ruin to their public affairs.

=== Panathenaicus ===
In Panathenaicus, Isocrates argues with a student about the literacy of the Spartans. In section 250, the student claims that the most intelligent of the Spartans admired and owned copies of some of Isocrates's speeches. The implication is that some Spartans had books, were able to read them, and were eager to do so. The Spartans, however, needed an interpreter to clear up any misunderstandings of double meanings which might lie concealed beneath the surface of complicated words. This text indicates that some Spartans were not illiterate. This text is important to scholars' understanding of literacy in Sparta because it indicates that Spartans were able to read and that they often put written documents to use in their public affairs.

=== Major orations ===
- Ad Demonicum
- Ad Nicoclem
- Archidamus
- Areopagiticus
- Busiris
- De Pace
- Evagoras
- Helena
- Nicocles
- Panegyricus
- Philippus

== Legacy ==
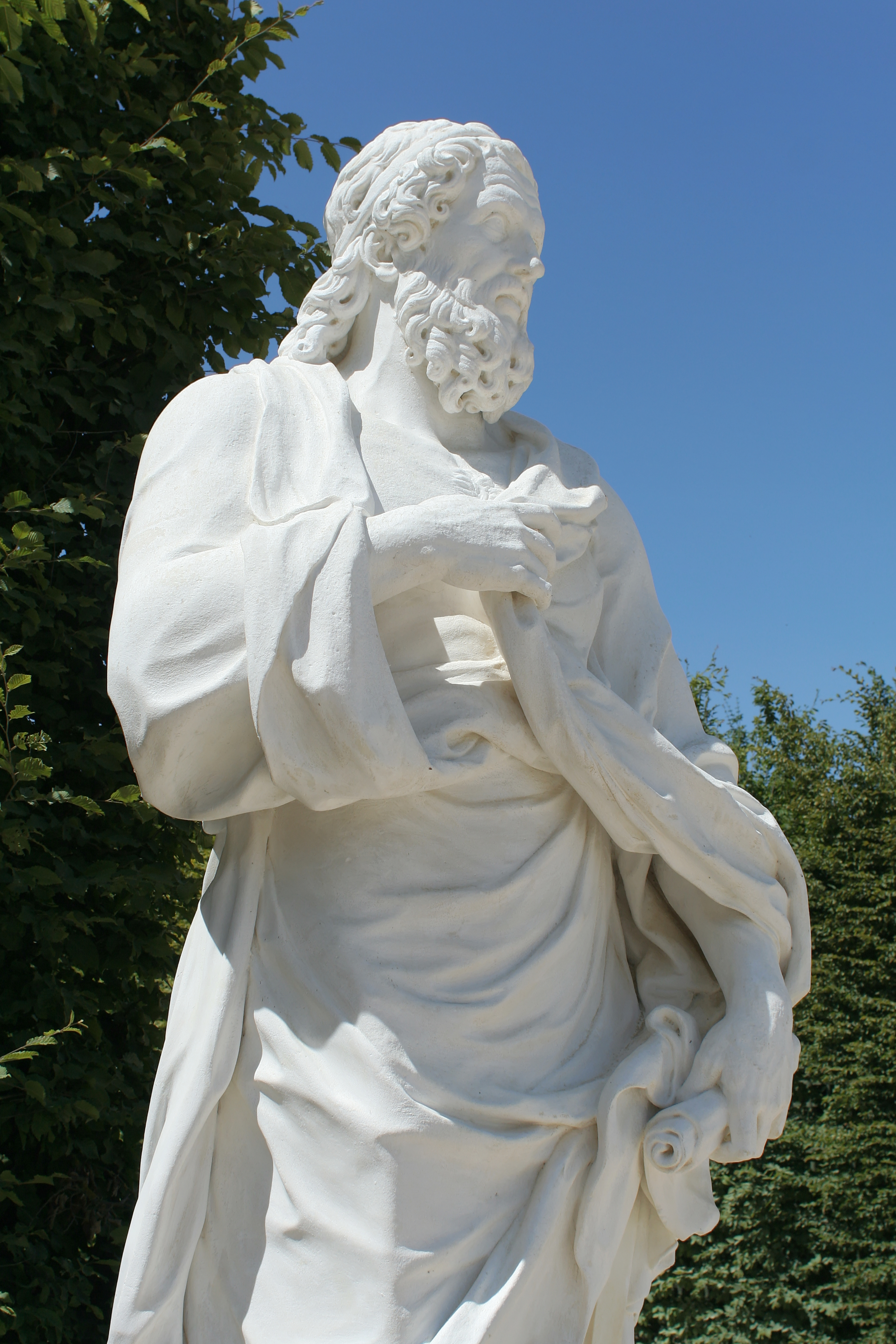
17th-century sculpture of Isocrates located at the Parc de Versailles

Because of Plato's attacks on the sophists, Isocrates's school – having its roots, if not the entirety of its mission, in rhetoric, the domain of the sophists – came to be viewed as unethical and deceitful. Yet many of Plato's criticisms are hard to substantiate in the actual work of Isocrates; at the end of Phaedrus, Plato even shows Socrates praising Isocrates (though some scholars have taken this to be sarcasm). Isocrates saw the ideal orator as someone who must possess not only rhetorical gifts, but also a wide knowledge of philosophy, science, and the arts. He promoted the Greek ideals of freedom, self-control, and virtue; in this, he influenced several Roman rhetoricians, such as Cicero and Quintilian, and influenced the core concepts of liberal arts education.

Isocrates' works on political and moral philosophy were extremely popular in Renaissance Europe and it was common practice to gift translations of To Nicocles to rulers as a form of mirror of princes. Isocrates was one of the top Greek writers mandated in grammar school and university curricula. Isocrates was a favorite of Queen Elizabeth and she read it often with her tutor Roger Ascham, even later in life. John Milton's Areopagitica deliberately draws on Isocrates' similarly titled speech.

Although Isocrates has been largely marginalized in the recent history of philosophy, his contributions to the study and practice of rhetoric have received much attention. Thomas M. Conley argues that through Isocrates's influence on Cicero, whose writings on rhetoric were the most widely and continuously studied until the modern era, "it might be said that Isocrates, of all the Greeks, was the greatest." With the neo-Aristotelian turn in rhetoric, Isocrates's work is sometimes cast as a mere precursor to Aristotle's systematic account in On Rhetoric. However, Ekaterina Haskins reads Isocrates as an enduring and worthwhile counter to Aristotelian rhetoric. Rather than the Aristotelian position on rhetoric as a neutral tool, Isocrates understands rhetoric as an identity-shaping performance that activates and sustains civic identity. The Isocratean position on rhetoric can be thought of as ancient antecedent to the twentieth-century theorist Kenneth Burke's conception that rhetoric is rooted in identification. Isocrates's work has also been described as proto-Pragmatist, owing to his assertion that rhetoric makes use of probable knowledge with the aim resolving real problems in the world.

Isocrates's innovations in the art of rhetoric paid closer attention to expression and rhythm than any other Greek writer, though because his sentences were so complex and artistic, he often sacrificed clarity.

== See also ==
- Anaximenes of Lampsacus
- Paideia
- Papyrus Oxyrhynchus 27
- Protrepticus (Aristotle)
