= Xenophanes =

Ancient Greek philosopher (c. 570 – c. 478 BC)

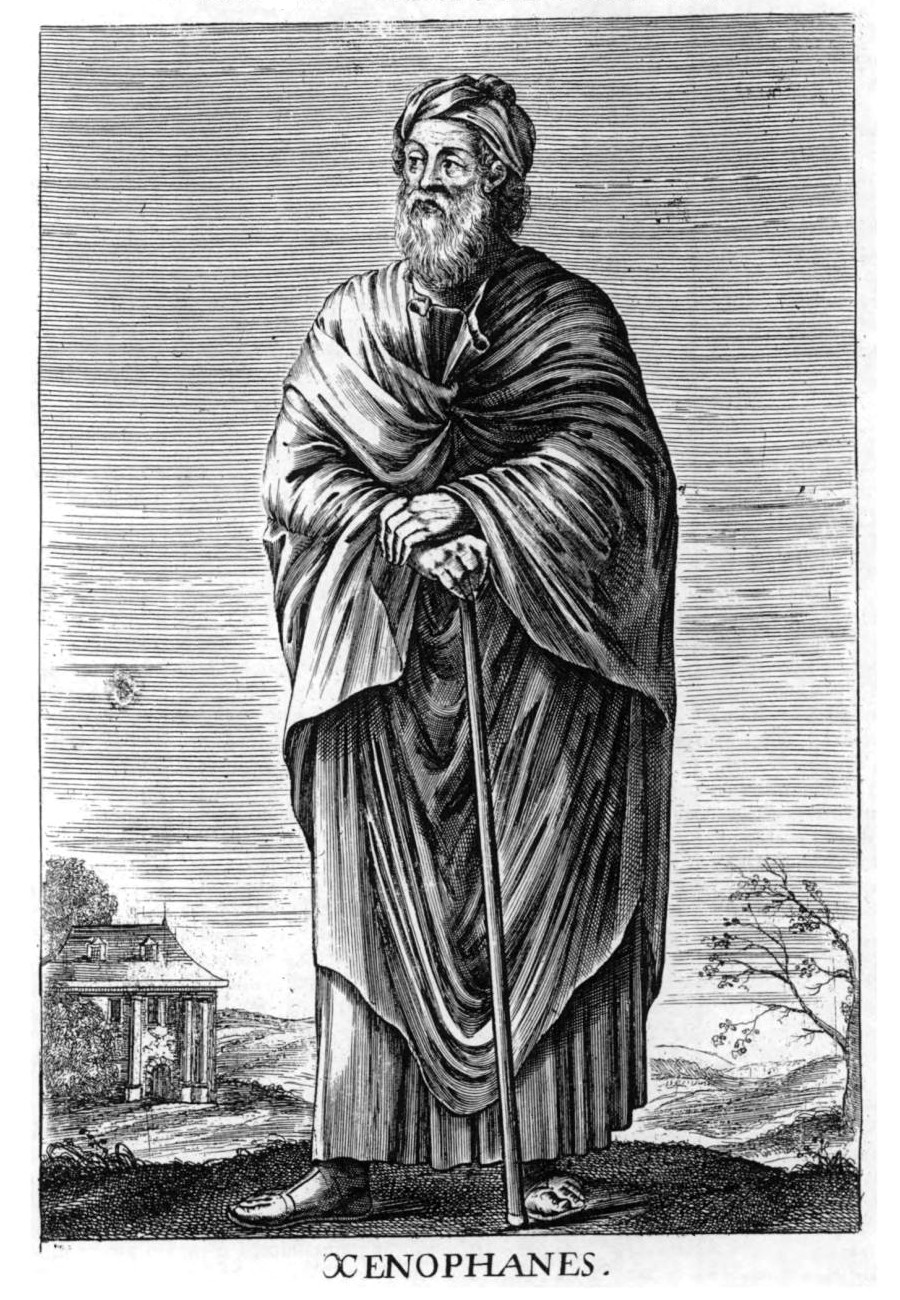
- Fictionalized portrait of Xenophanes from a 17th-century engraving
- Born: c. 570 BC; Colophon, Ionian League
- Died: c. 478 BC (aged c. 92); Syracuse, Sicily (modern-day Italy)

Philosophical work
- Era: Pre-Socratic philosophy
- Region: Western philosophy
- Main interests: Social criticism Natural philosophy Epistemology
- Notable ideas: Polytheistic religious views as human projections Earth is the arche The distinction between knowledge and mere true belief

Xenophanes of Colophon (/zəˈnɒfəniːz/ zuh-NOF-uh-neez; Ancient Greek: Ξενοφάνης ὁ Κολοφώνιος [ksenopʰánɛːs ho kolopʰɔ̌ːnios]; c. 570 – c. 478 BC) was a pre-Socratic Greek philosopher, poet, and critic of Homer. He was born in Ionia and travelled throughout the Greek-speaking world in early classical antiquity.

As a poet, Xenophanes was known for his critical style, writing poems that are considered among the first satires. He composed elegiac couplets that criticised his society's traditional values of wealth, excesses, and athletic victories. He criticised Homer and the other poets in his works for representing the gods as foolish or morally weak. His poems have not survived intact; only fragments of some of his work survive in quotations by later philosophers and literary critics.

Xenophanes is seen as one of the most important pre-Socratic philosophers. A highly original thinker, Xenophanes sought explanations for physical phenomena such as clouds or rainbows without references to divine or mythological explanations, but instead based on first principles. He distinguished between different forms of knowledge and belief, an early instance of epistemology. Later philosophers such as the Eleatics and the Pyrrhonists saw Xenophanes as the founder of their doctrines, and interpreted his work in terms of those doctrines, although modern scholarship disputes these claims.

== Life ==
The ancient biographer Diogenes Laertius reports that Xenophanes was born in Colophon, a city that once existed in Ionia, in present-day Turkey. Laertius stated that Xenophanes is said to have flourished during the 60th Olympiad (540–537 BC), (Note: Diogenes Laertius, ix. 18-20 (DK 21A1)) and modern scholars generally place his birth some time around 570–560 BC. His surviving work refers to Thales, Epimenides, and Pythagoras, (Note: Diogenes Laertius) and he himself is mentioned in the writings of Heraclitus and Epicharmus. (Note: Diogenes Laertius, ix. 1; Aristotle, Metaphysics)

By his own surviving account, he was an itinerant poet who left his native land at the age of 25 and lived 67 years in other Greek lands, dying at or after the age of 92. Although ancient testimony notes that he buried his sons, there is little other biographical information about him or his family that can be reliably ascertained.

It is considered likely Xenophanes' physical theories were influenced by the Milesians. For instance, his theory that the rainbow is clouds is on one interpretation seen as a response to Anaximenes's theory that the rainbow is light reflected off of clouds.

== Poems ==
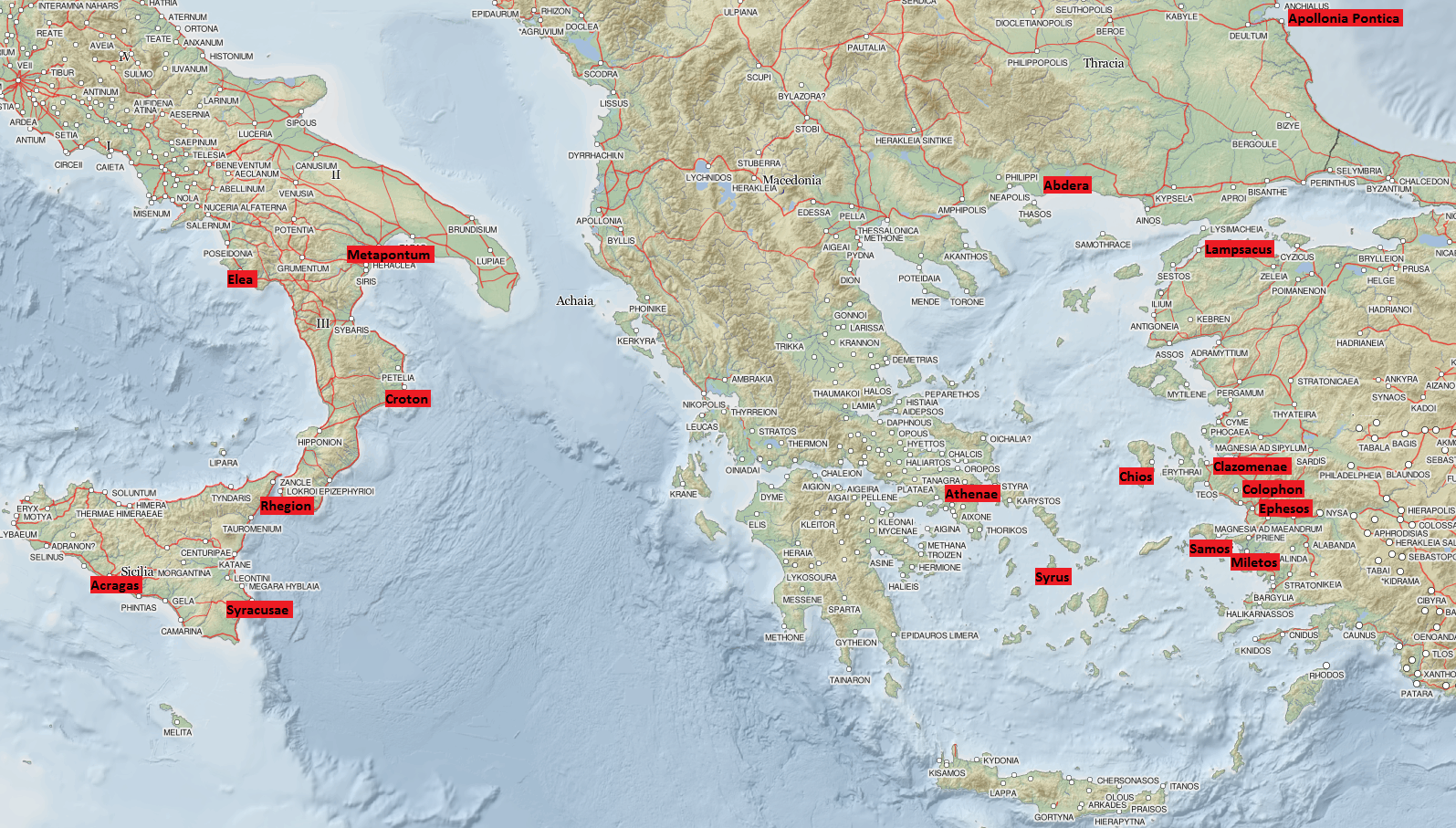
Xenophanes characterised his travels as "tossing up and down" Ancient Greece in the archaic period. His travels took him from Colophon, Ionia in present-day Turkey as far as colonies in Magna Graecia in present-day Italy

Knowledge of Xenophanes' views comes from fragments of his poetry that survive as quotations by later Greek writers. Unlike other pre-Socratic philosophers such as Heraclitus or Parmenides, who only wrote one work, Xenophanes wrote a variety of poems, and no two of the fragments can positively be identified as belonging to the same text. According to Diogenes Laertius, (Note: DK 28A1) Xenophanes wrote a poem on the foundation of Colophon and Elea, which ran to approximately 2000 lines. Later testimony suggests that his collection of satires was assembled in at least five books. Although many later sources attribute a poem titled "On Nature" to Xenophanes, modern scholars doubt this label, as it was likely a name given by scholars at the Library of Alexandria to works written by philosophers that Aristotle had identified as "phusikoi" who studied nature.

=== Satires ===
The satires are called Silloi, and this name may go back to Xenophanes himself, but it may originate that the Pyrrhonist philosopher Timon of Phlius, the "sillographer" (3rd century BC), put much of his own satire upon other philosophers into the mouth of Xenophanes, one of the few philosophers Timon praises in his work.

Xenophanes' surviving writings display a skepticism that became more commonly expressed during the fourth century BC. Several of the philosophical fragments are derived from commentators on Homer. He aimed his critique at the polytheistic religious views of earlier Greek poets and of his own contemporaries.

To judge from these later accounts, (Note: Diogenes Laertius, ix. 18-20 (DK 21A1)) his elegiac and iambic poetry criticized and satirized a wide range of ideas, including Homer and Hesiod, the belief in the pantheon of anthropomorphic gods and the Greeks' veneration of athleticism.

=== On Nature ===
There is no good authority that says that Xenophanes specifically wrote a philosophical poem. John Burnet says that "The oldest reference to a poem Περὶ φύσεως is in the Geneva scholium on Iliad xxi. 196, (Note: DK 21B30) and this goes back to Crates of Mallus. We must remember that such titles are of later date, and Xenophanes had been given a place among philosophers long before the time of Crates. All we can say, therefore, is that the Pergamene librarians gave the title Περὶ φύσεως to some poem of Xenophanes." However, even if Xenophanes never wrote a specific poem title On Nature, many of the surviving fragments deal with topics in natural philosophy such as clouds or rainbows, and it is thus likely that the philosophical remarks of Xenophanes were expressed incidentally in his satires.

== Philosophy ==
Although Xenophanes has traditionally been interpreted in terms of the Eleatics and Skeptics who were influenced by him and saw him as their predecessor and founder, modern scholarship considers him to be a highly original and distinct philosopher whose philosophy extends well beyond the influence he had on later philosophical schools. As a social critic, Xenophanes composed poems on proper behavior at a symposium and criticized the cultural glorification of athletes. Xenophanes sought to reform the understanding of divine nature by casting doubt on Greek mythology as relayed by Hesiod and Homer, in order to make it more consistent with notions of piety from Ancient Greek religion. He formulated natural explanations for phenomena such as the formation of clouds and rainbows rather than myths, satirizing traditional religious views of his time as human projections. As an early thinker in epistemology, he drew distinctions between the ideas of knowledge and belief as opposed to truth, which he believed was only possible for the gods.

=== Social criticism ===
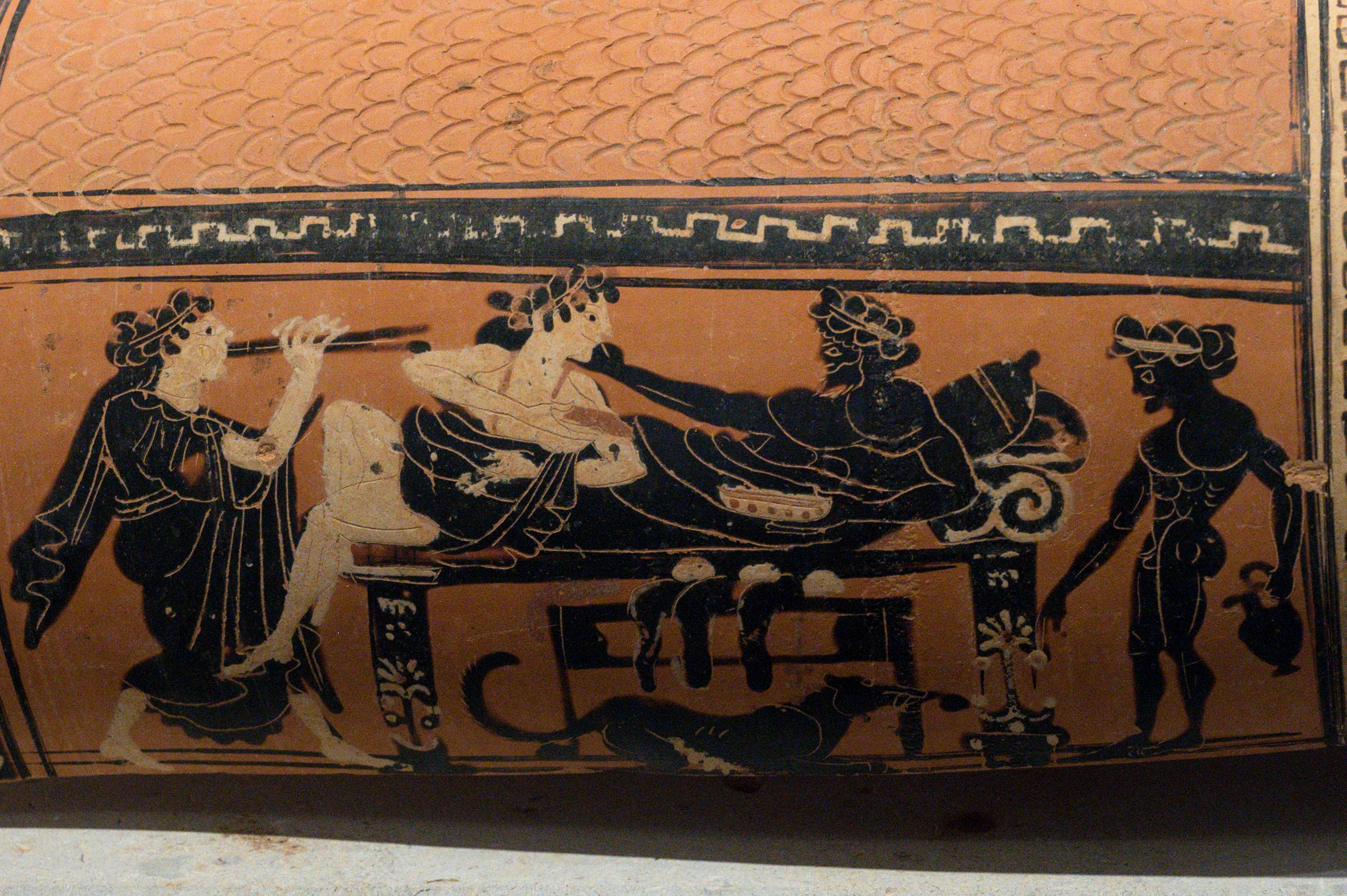
6th century BC depiction of an Ancient Greek symposium. Xenophanes criticized these drinking parties as they were celebrated in his time for their excesses and failures to honor the gods.

Xenophanes wrote a number of elegiac poems on proper conduct at a symposium, the Ancient Greek drinking parties that were held to commemorate athletic or poetic victories, or to welcome young men into aristocratic society. The surviving fragments stress the importance of piety and honor to the gods, (Note: To hymn the praises of the Gods; and so / With pure libations and well-order'd vows / To win from them the power to act with justice / For this comes from the favour of the Gods;(DK 21B1)) and they discourage drunkenness (Note: And never let a man a goblet take / And first pour in the wine; but let the water / Come first, and after that, then add the wine.(DK 21B5)) and intemperance, endorsing moderation and criticism of luxury and excess. (Note: They learnt all sorts of useless foolishness / From the effeminate Lydians, while they / Were held in bondage to sharp tyranny / They went into the forum richly clad / In purple garments, in numerous companies / Whose strength was not less than a thousand men / Boasting of hair luxuriously dress'd / Dripping with costly and sweet-smelling oils.(DK 21B3)) Xenophanes rejected the value of athletic victories, stating that cultivating wisdom was more important. (Note: For wisdom far exceeds in real value / The bodily strength of man, or horses' speed;/ But the mob judges of such things at random; / Though 'tis not right to prefer strength to sense:(DK 21B2))

=== Divine nature ===
Orphism and Pythagorean philosophy introduced into the Greek spirituality the notions of guilt and pureness, causing a dichotomic belief between the divine soul and the mortal body. This doctrine is in contrast with the traditional religions as espoused by Homer and Hesiod. God moves all things, but he is thought to be immobile, characterized by oneness (Note: "One god, the greatest among gods and men, neither in form like unto mortals nor in thought." (DK 21B23)) and unicity, eternity, and a spiritual nature which is bodiless and is not anthropomorphic. He has a free will and is the Highest Good, he embodies the beauty of the moral perfection and of the absence of sin.

Xenophanes espoused a belief that "God is one, supreme among gods and men, and not like mortals in body or in mind". He maintained that there was one greatest God. God is one eternal being, spherical in form, comprehending all things within himself, is the absolute mind and thought, (Note: Diogenes Laertius, ix. 18-20 (DK 21A1)) therefore is intelligent, and moves all things, but bears no resemblance to human nature either in body or mind. While Xenophanes rejected Homeric theology, he did not question the presence of a divine entity; rather his philosophy was a critique on Ancient Greek writers and their conception of divinity. Regarding Xenophanes' positive theology five key concepts about God can be formed. God is: beyond human morality, does not resemble human form, cannot die or be born (God is divine thus eternal), no divine hierarchy exists, and God does not intervene in human affairs.

=== Natural philosophy ===
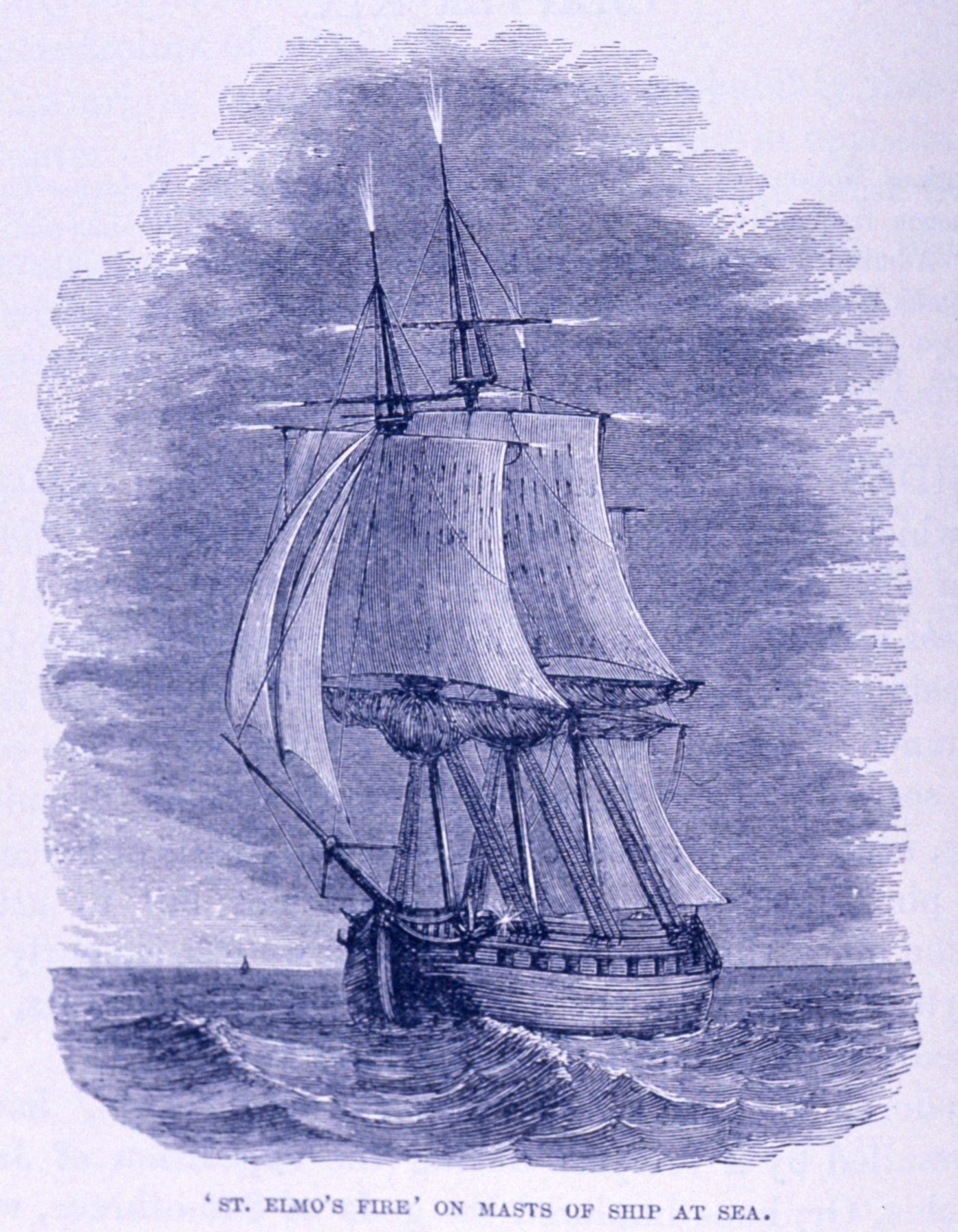
Xenophanes was likely the first philosopher to offer a naturalistic rather than a mythological explanation for St. Elmo's fire.

Xenophanes' understanding of divine nature as separate and uninvolved in human affairs motivated him to come up with naturalistic explanations for physical phenomena.

Xenophanes was likely the first philosopher to come up with an explanation for the manifestation of St. Elmo's fire that appears on the masts of ships when they pass through clouds during a thunderstorm. Although the actual phenomenon behind St. Elmo's fire would not be understood until the discovery of static electricity in the modern era, Xenophanes' explanation, which attempted to explain the glow as being caused by agitations of small droplets of clouds, was unique in the ancient world.

In Xenophanes' cosmology, there is only one boundary to the universe, the one "seen by our feet". Xenophanes believed that the earth extended infinitely far down, as well as infinitely far in every direction. A consequence of his belief in an infinitely extended earth was that rather than having the sun pass under the earth at sunset, Xenophanes believed that the sun and the moon traveled along a straight line westward, after which point a new sun or moon would be reconstituted after an eclipse. While this potentially infinite series of suns and moons traveling would likely be considered objectionable to modern scientists, this means that Xenophanes understood the sun and moon as a "type" of object that appeared in the sky, rather than a specific individual object that reappeared every new day.

Xenophanes concluded from his examination of fossils of sea creatures that were found above land that water once must have covered all of the Earth's surface. He used this evidence to conclude that the arche or cosmic principle of the universe was a tide flowing in and out between wet and dry, or earth (γῆ) and water (ὕδωρ). These two extreme states would alternate between one another, and with the alternation human life would become extinct, then regenerate (or vice versa depending on the dominant form). The argument can be considered a rebuke to Anaximenes' air theory. The idea of alternating states and human life perishing and coming back suggests he believed in the principle of causation, another distinguishing step that Xenophanes takes away from Ancient philosophical traditions to ones based more on scientific observation. This use of evidence was an important step in advancing from simply stating an idea to backing it up by evidence and observation.

=== Epistemology ===
Xenophanes is one of the first philosophers to show interest in epistemological questions as well as metaphysical ones. He held that there actually exists an objective truth in reality, but that as mere mortals, humans are unable to know it. He is credited with being one of the first philosophers to distinguish between true belief and knowledge, as well as acknowledge the prospect that one can think he knows something but not really know it.

His verses on skepticism are quoted by Sextus Empiricus as follows:

Yet, with regard to the gods and what I declare about all things:
No man has seen what is clear nor will any man ever know it.
Nay, for even should he chance to affirm what is really existent,
He himself knoweth it not; for all is swayed by opining. (Note: quoted by Sextus Empiricus,(DK 21B34))

Due to the lack of whole works by Xenophanes, his views are difficult to interpret, so that the implication of knowing being something deeper ("a clearer truth") may have special implications, or it may mean that you cannot know something just by looking at it. It is known that the most and widest variety of evidence was considered by Xenophanes to be the surest way to prove a theory.

== Legacy and influence ==
Xenophanes's influence has been interpreted variously as "the founder of epistemology, a poet and rhapsode and not a philosopher at all, the first skeptic, the first empiricist, a rationalist theologian, a reformer of religion, and more besides." Karl Popper read Xenophanes as an early precursor of critical rationalism, saying that it is possible to act only on the basis of working hypotheses—we may act as if we knew the truth, as long as we know that this is extremely unlikely.

=== Influence on Eleatics ===
Many later ancient accounts associate Xenophanes with the Greek colony in the Italian city of Elea, either as the author of a poem on the founding of that city, (Note: DK 28A1) or as the founder of the Eleatic school of philosophy, or as the teacher of Parmenides of Elea. (Note: A2, A30, A31) Others associate him with Pythagoreanism. However, modern scholars generally believe that there is little historical or philosophical justification for these associations between Pythagoras, Xenophanes, and Parmenides as is oft alleged in succession of the so-called "Italian school". It had similarly been common since antiquity to see Xenophanes as the teacher of Zeno of Elea, the colleague of Parmenides, but common opinion today is likewise that this is false.

In his ninety-second year he was still, we have seen, leading a wandering life, which is hardly consistent with the statement that he settled at Elea and founded a school there, especially if we are to think of him as spending his last days at Hieron's court. It is very remarkable that no ancient writer expressly says he ever was at Elea, and all the evidence we have seems inconsistent with his having settled there at all.

=== Influence on Pyrrhonism ===
Xenophanes is sometimes considered the first skeptic in Western philosophy. Xenophanes's alleged skepticism can also be seen as a precursor to Pyrrhonism. Sextus quotes Pyrrho's follower Timon as praising Xenophanes and dedicating his satires to him, and giving him as an example of somebody who is not a perfect skeptic (like Pyrrho), but who is forgivably close to it.

Eusebius quoting Aristocles of Messene says that Xenophanes was the founder of a line of philosophy that culminated in Pyrrhonism. This line begins with Xenophanes and goes through Parmenides, Melissus of Samos, Zeno of Elea, Leucippus, Democritus, Protagoras, Nessos of Chios, Metrodorus of Chios, Diogenes of Smyrna, Anaxarchus, and finally Pyrrho.

=== Pantheism ===
Because of his development of the concept of a "one god greatest among gods and men," Xenophanes is often seen as one of the first monotheists in Western philosophy of religion. However, the same referenced quotation refers to multiple "gods" who the supreme God is greater than. This god "shakes all things" by the power of his thought alone. Differently from the human creatures, God has the power to give "immediate execution" (in Greek: to phren) and make effective his cognitive faculty (in Greek: nous).

The thought of Xenophanes was summarized as monolatrous and pantheistic by the ancient doxographies of Aristotle, Cicero, Diogenes Laertius, Sextus Empiricus, and Plutarch. More particularly, Aristotle's Metaphysics summarized his view as "the All is God." The pseudo-Aristotlelian treatise On Melissus, Xenophanes, and Gorgias also contains a significant testimony of his teachings. Pierre Bayle considered Xenophanes views similar to Spinoza. Physicist and philosopher Max Bernhard Weinstein specifically identified Xenophanes as one of the earliest pandeists. (Note: "Pandeistisch ist, wenn der Eleate Xenophanes (aus Kolophon um 580-492 v. Chr.) von Gott gesagt haben soll: "Er ist ganz und gar Geist und Gedanke und ewig", "er sieht ganz und gar, er denkt ganz und gar, er hört ganz und gar.")

Xenophanes's view of an impersonal god seemed to influence the pre-Socratic Empedocles, who viewed god as an incorporeal mind. However, Empedocles called Xenophanes's view that Earth is flat and extends downward forever to be foolishness.

== Bibliography ==
=== Ancient primary sources ===
In the Diels-Kranz numbering for testimony and fragments of Pre-Socratic philosophy, Xenophanes is catalogued as number 21.

The most recent edition of this catalogue is Diels, Hermann; Kranz, Walther (1957). Plamböck, Gert (ed.). Die Fragmente der Vorsokratiker (in Ancient Greek and German). Rowohlt. ISBN 5875607416..

==== Biography ====
- A1. Laërtius, Diogenes. "Others: Xenophanes" . Lives of the Eminent Philosophers. Vol. 2:9. Translated by Hicks, Robert Drew (Two volume ed.). Loeb Classical Library.
- A2. Laërtius, Diogenes. "Others: Parmenides" . Lives of the Eminent Philosophers. Vol. 2:9. Translated by Hicks, Robert Drew (Two volume ed.). Loeb Classical Library.
- A3. Laërtius, Diogenes. "Others: Heraclitus" . Lives of the Eminent Philosophers. Vol. 2:9. Translated by Hicks, Robert Drew (Two volume ed.). Loeb Classical Library.
- A4. Cicero. Academica. II.118.
- A5. Laërtius, Diogenes. "Pythagoreans: Empedocles" . Lives of the Eminent Philosophers. Vol. 2:8. Translated by Hicks, Robert Drew (Two volume ed.). Loeb Classical Library.
- A6. Pseudo-Lucian. Macrobii. 20.
- A7. Censorinus (1900). "On Old Age". De Die Natali. 15, 3.
- A8. Clement of Alexandria. "Book I" . Stromata – via Wikisource.
- A9. Eusebius. Chronicon Paschale. Ol. 56.
- A10. Iamblichus. Iamblichi Theologoumena arithmeticae (in Latin).

==== Apothegems ====
- A11. Plutarch. "Sayings of Kings and Commanders". Moralia. Stephanus p.175c.
- A12. Aristotle. Rhetoric. Bekker 1399b.
- A13. Aristotle. Rhetoric. Bekker 1400b.
- A14. Aristotle. Rhetoric. Bekker 1377a.
- A15. Aristotle. Metaphysics. Bekker 1399b.
- A16. Plutarch. "On Compliancy". Moralia. 530e.
- A17. Plutarch. "On Common Conceptions against the Stoics". Moralia. Archived from the original on 2019-07-15.

==== Descriptions of poems ====
- A18. Laërtius, Diogenes. "Others: Parmenides" . Lives of the Eminent Philosophers. Vol. 2:9. Translated by Hicks, Robert Drew (Two volume ed.). Loeb Classical Library.
- A19. Laërtius, Diogenes. "Others: Xenophanes" . Lives of the Eminent Philosophers. Vol. 2:9. Translated by Hicks, Robert Drew (Two volume ed.). Loeb Classical Library.
- A20. Strabo. Geography.
- A21. Apuleius. Florida.
- A22. Proclus. Commentary on Hesiod's Works and Days.
- A23. Scholia.
- A24. Arius Didymus. Doxographi Graeci.
- A25. Cicero. Academica. II.74.
- A26. Philo. On Providence.
- A27. Athenaeus. Deipnosophistae. 632cd.

==== Doctrines ====
- A28. Pseudo-Aristotle (1936). "On Melissus, Xenophanes, Gorgias". Aristotle: Minor Works. Loeb Classical Library. Harvard University Press. Bekker p.977a-979a. ISBN 978-0-674-99338-9.
- A29. Plato. Sophist. Stephanus 242c-d.
- A30. Aristotle. Metaphysics. Bekker 986b.
- A31. Simplicius of Cilicia. Commentary on Aristotle's Physics.
- A32. Pseudo-Plutarch. "Opinions of the Philosophers". Moralia. Book II.4.
- A33. Hippolytus of Rome. Refutation of All Heresies. p. Book I.14 – via Wikisource.
- A34. Cicero. Academica. II.118.
- A35. Pseudo-Galen. History of Philosophy.
- A36-46. Aetius. Placita.
- A47. Aristotle. On the Heavens. Bekker 294a.
- A48. Pseudo-Aristotle. On Marvellous Things Heard. Bekker 833a.
- A49. Aristocles of Messene. On Philosophy. Quoted in Eusebius, Praeparatio Evangelica Book 14 Chapter XVII.
- A50. Macrobius. Commentarii in Somnium Scipionis (in Latin). Sectio_XIIII – via Wikisource.
- A51. Tertullian. Treatise On the Soul. Chapter XLIII.
- A52. Cicero. De Divinatione.

==== Fragments, elegies ====
- B1. Athanaeus. Deipnosophistae. 11.462c.
- B2. Athanaeus. Deipnosophistae. 10.413f.
- B3. Athanaeus. Deipnosophistae. 12.526a.
- B4. Julius Pollux. Onomasticon.
- B5. Athanaeus. Deipnosophistae. 11.782a.
- B6. Athanaeus. Deipnosophistae. 9.368e.
- B7. Laërtius, Diogenes. "Pythagoreans: Empedocles" . Lives of the Eminent Philosophers. Vol. 2:8. Translated by Hicks, Robert Drew (Two volume ed.). Loeb Classical Library.
- B8. Laërtius, Diogenes. "Others: Xenophanes" . Lives of the Eminent Philosophers. Vol. 2:9. Translated by Hicks, Robert Drew (Two volume ed.). Loeb Classical Library.
- B9. Etymologicum Genuinum. γῆρας.

==== Fragments, silloi ====
- B10. Aelius Herodianus. On Doubtful Syllables. 296.6.
- B11. Sextus Empiricus. Against the Physicists. Book I.193.
- B12. Sextus Empiricus. Against the Grammarians. Book I.289.
- B13. Aulus Gellius. Attic Nights. 3.11.
- B14-15. Clement of Alexandria. Stromata. p. 285 – via Wikisource.
- B16. Clement of Alexandria. Stromata. p. 421 – via Wikisource.
- B17. Scholia to Aristophanes Knights.
- B18. Stobaeus. Eclogues. Book I/8/2.
- B19. Laërtius, Diogenes. "The Seven Sages: Thales" . Lives of the Eminent Philosophers. Vol. 1:1. Translated by Hicks, Robert Drew (Two volume ed.). Loeb Classical Library.
- B20. Laërtius, Diogenes. "The Seven Sages: Epimenides" . Lives of the Eminent Philosophers. Vol. 1:1. Translated by Hicks, Robert Drew (Two volume ed.). Loeb Classical Library.
- B21. Scholia to Aristophanes Peace.
- B21a. Oxyrhynchus Papyri. 1087.40.
- B22. Athenaeus. Deipnosophistae. 2.54e.

==== Fragments, On Nature ====
- B23. Clement of Alexandria. Stromata. 5.109.
- B24. Sextus Empiricus. Against the Physicists. Book I.144.
- B25. Simplicius of Cilicia. Commentary on Aristotle's Physics. 23.19.
- B26. Simplicius of Cilicia. Commentary on Aristotle's Physics. 23.10.
- B27. Theodoretus. Treatment of Greek Conditions.
- B28. Achilles Tatius. Introduction to the Phaenomena of Aratus.
- B29. John Philoponus. Commentary on Aristotle's Physics. 1.5.125.
- B30. Geneva Scholia to Iliad. 21.196.
- B31. Heraclitus (commentator) (2005). Homeric Problems. Society of Biblical Literature. 44.5. ISBN 978-1-58983-122-3.
- B32. Allen, Thomas William (1931). The Homeric Scholia. H. Milford. BLT Iliad 11.27.
- B33. Sextus Empiricus. Against the Physicists. Book II.314.
- B34. Sextus Empiricus. Against the Logicians. Book I.49.
- B35. Plutarch. "Table Talk". Moralia. Stephanus p.746b.
- B36. Aelius Herodianus. On doubtful syllables. 296.9.
- B37. Aelius Herodianus. On peculiar style. 30.
- B38. Aelius Herodianus. On peculiar style. 41.5.
- B39. Julius Pollux. Onomasticon.
- B40. Etymologicum Genuinum. βάτραχος.
- B41. John Tzetzes. Scholia to Dionysius Periegetes. 940.
- B42. Aelius Herodianus. On peculiar style. 41.5.
- B45. Scholia to On Epidemics. 1.13.3.

==== Imitation ====
- C1. Euripides. Herakles (Euripides).
- C2 Athanaeus. Deipnosophistae.

=== Modern criticism ===
- Popper, Karl (1998). The World of Parmenides: Essays on the Presocratic Enlightenment. Psychology Press. p. 46. ISBN 978-0-415-17301-8.

=== Modern scholarship ===
==== Translations of the fragments with commentary ====
- Burnet, John (1892). "Science and Religion". Early Greek Philosophy. A. and C. Black. pp. 83–129.
- Fairbanks, Arthur (1898). The first philosophers of Greece. New York : Scribner.
- Graham, Daniel W. (2010). "Xenophanes". The Texts of Early Greek Philosophy: The Complete Fragments and Selected Testimonies of the Major Presocratics. Cambridge University Press. pp. 95–134. ISBN 978-0-521-84591-5.
- Kirk, G. S.; Raven, J. E.; Schofield, M. (29 December 1983). The Presocratic Philosophers: A Critical History with a Selection of Texts. Cambridge University Press. ISBN 978-0-521-27455-5.
- Lesher, James H. (1992). Xenophanes of Colophon: Fragments : a Text and Translation with a Commentary. University of Toronto Press. ISBN 978-0-8020-8508-5.
- McKirahan, Richard D. (1994). "Xenophanes of Colophon". Philosophy Before Socrates: An Introduction with Texts and Commentary. Hackett Publishing Company. ISBN 978-0-87220-175-0.
- Trzaskoma, Stephen M.; Smith, R. Scott; Brunet, Stephen; Palaima, Thomas G. (1 March 2004). Anthology of Classical Myth: Primary Sources in Translation. Hackett Publishing. p. 433. ISBN 978-1-60384-427-7.
- Weinstein, Max Bernhard (1910). Welt- und Lebenanschauungen; hervorgegangen aus Religion, Philosophie und Naturerkenntnis (in German). Litres. p. 231. ISBN 978-5-04-120710-6.

==== Extended studies and reviews ====
- Barnes, Jonathan (1982). The Presocratic Philosophers. Routledge. ISBN 978-0-415-05079-1.
- Dalby, Andrew (2006). Rediscovering Homer. New York, London: Norton. p. 123. ISBN 0-393-05788-7.
- Edwards, M. J. (2005). "Xenophanes Christianus?". Greek, Roman, and Byzantine Studies. 32 (3). Duke University Press: 220. ISBN 9781351219143. ISSN 0017-3916. OCLC 8162351763. Archived from the original on March 1, 2014.
- Johansen, Karsten Friis (1999). A history of ancient philosophy: from the beginnings to Augustine. Taylor & Francis. ISBN 9780203979808.
- Lesher, James (2019). "Xenophanes". In Zalta, Edward N. (ed.). Stanford Encyclopedia of Philosophy. ISSN 1095-5054. OCLC 429049174.
- Lesher, James (2021). "Xenophanes". In Zalta, Edward N. (ed.). The Stanford Encyclopedia of Philosophy (Summer 2021 ed.). Metaphysics Research Lab, Stanford University.
- Luchte, James (2011). Early Greek Thought: Before the Dawn. London: Bloomsbury Publishing. ISBN 978-0567353313.
- Mackenzie, Tom (2021). "Xenophanes". Poetry and poetics in the Presocratic philosophers : reading Xenophanes, Parmenides and Empedocles as literature. Cambridge, United Kingdom: Cambridge University Press. pp. 24–64. ISBN 9781108843935.
- Meza, Carlos Gustavo Carrasco (2010). "La tradición en la teología de Jenófanes" [Tradition in Xenophanes' theology] (PDF). Byzantion nea hellás (in Spanish and English) (29). Santiago: University of Chile: 55, 57. doi:10.4067/S0718-84712010000100004 (inactive 14 November 2026). ISSN 0718-8471. OCLC 7179329409. Archived from the original on September 17, 2020.
- Mourelatos, Alexander (2008). "The Cloud - Astrophysics of Xenophanes and Ionian Material Monism". The Oxford Handbook of Presocratic Philosophy. Oxford: Oxford University Press. pp. 134–168. ISBN 978-0-19-514687-5.
- Osborne, Catherine (22 April 2004). Presocratic Philosophy: A Very Short Introduction. OUP Oxford. pp. 61–79. ISBN 978-0-19-157822-9.
- Warren, James (2007). Presocratics. Acumen. ISBN 978-1-84465-091-0.
