= Italian school (philosophy) =

Map of ancient Magna Graecia, on the western side of the Adriatic Sea.

The Italian school of pre-Socratic philosophy refers to Ancient Greek philosophers in Italy or Magna Graecia in the 6th and 5th century BC. Contemporary scholarship disputes the Italian school as a historical school rather than simply a geographical one.

The doxographer Diogenes Laërtius divides pre-Socratic philosophy into the Ionian and Italian school. According to classicist Jonathan Barnes, "Although the Italian 'school' was founded by émigrés from Ionia, it quickly took on a character of its own." According to classicist W. K. C. Guthrie, it contrasted with the "materialistic and purely rational Milesians."

The Italian school included the Pythagorean school, Parmenides and the Eleatic school, Xenophanes, and Empedocles. According to Diogenes Laërtius, the succession goes Pythagoras (“pupil of Pherecydes”), Telauges (his son), Xenophanes, Parmenides, Zeno of Elea, Leucippus, Democritus (“who had many pupils”), Nausiphanes [and Naucydes] (“in particular”), and Epicurus (Succession ends). Parmenides, Xenophanes, and Empedocles all wrote in verse.

Aristotle notes, as he criticizes the Pythagorean view of a Counter-Earth, "Most people...say it lies at the center. But the Italian philosophers known as Pythagoreans take the contrary view."

== Pythagoras ==
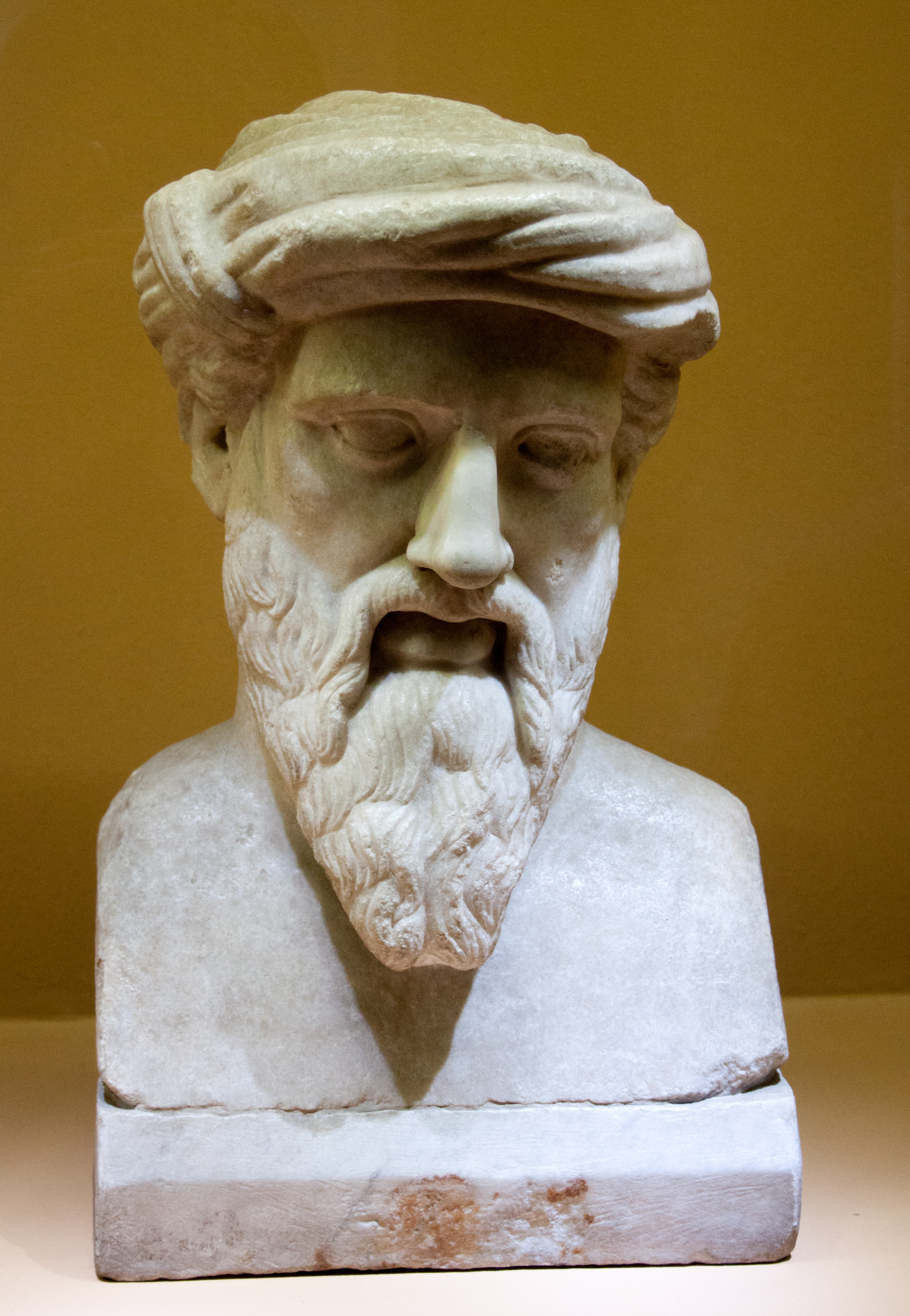
Bust of Pythagoras

Pythagoras traveled from Samos to Croton circa 530 BC, beginning the separation from the earlier Ionian schools. The Pythagoreans established a dualist philosophical school and religious sect concerned with such things as mathematics, music, and medicine; for example Alcmaeon of Croton. According to Iamblichus, of all the pre-socratic schools, the Pythagoreans had the most adherents.

Soon after the victory of Croton over Sybaris in 510 BC, the Pythagoreans were attacked at their meeting place by a democratic group led by Cylon. There was also a second attack on the Pythagoreans at the former house of the wrestler Milo in 454 BC. Thereafter, it seems Pythagoreans fled across the Tarantine Gulf and were found in places such as Metapontum and Tarentum. Perhaps this is what led to Philolaus fleeing back to Greece and instilling Pythagorean ideas on the mainland.

The teaching most securely identified with Pythagoras is metempsychosis, or the "transmigration of souls", which holds that every soul is immortal and, upon death, enters into a new body. He may have also devised the doctrine of musica universalis, which holds that the planets move according to mathematical equations and thus resonate to produce an inaudible symphony of music. Scholars debate whether Pythagoras developed the numerological and musical teachings attributed to him, or if those teachings were developed by his followers.

In antiquity, Pythagoras was credited with many mathematical and scientific discoveries, including the Pythagorean theorem, Pythagorean tuning, the five regular solids, the Theory of Proportions, the sphericity of the Earth, and the identity of the morning and evening stars as the planet Venus. It was said that he was the first man to call himself a philosopher ("lover of wisdom") (Note: Cicero, Tusculan Disputations, 5.3.8–9 (citing Heraclides Ponticus fr. 88 Wehrli), Diogenes Laërtius 1.12, 8.8, Iamblichus VP 58. Burkert attempted to discredit this ancient tradition, but it has been defended by C. J. De Vogel, Pythagoras and Early Pythagoreanism (1966), pp. 97–102, and C. Riedweg, Pythagoras: His Life, Teaching, And Influence (2005), p. 92.) and that he was the first to divide the globe into five climatic zones.

The Platonic dialogue Timaeus is named for a Pythagorean from Locri. Iccus of Taranto is considered the founder of athletic dieting. Terenzio, Count Mamiani della Rovere sought to restore the Pythagorean influence on Italian philosophy.

== Xenophanes ==
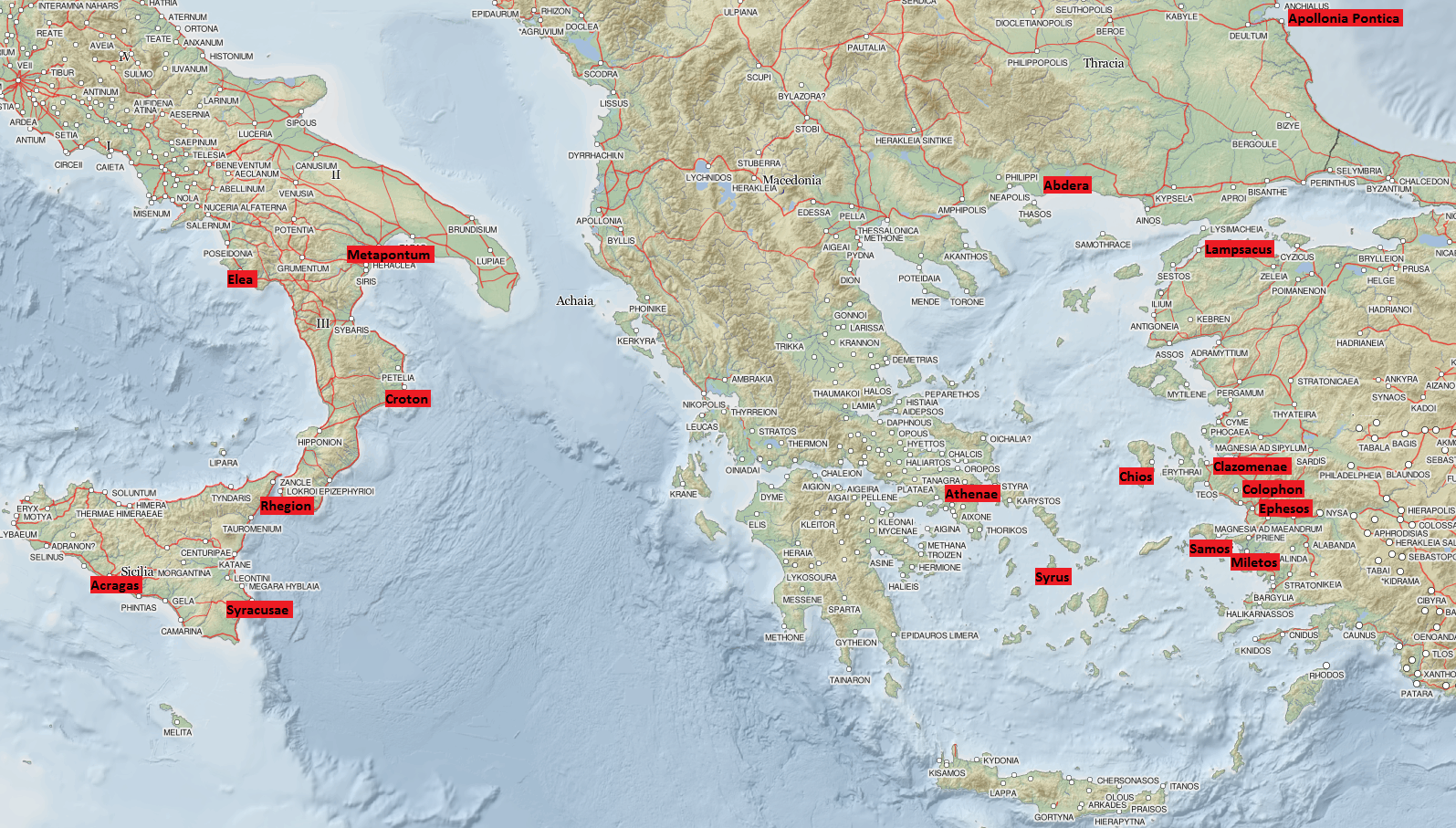
Xenophanes characterised his travels as "tossing up and down" (Note: DK 21B8) Ancient Greece in the archaic period. His travels took him from Colophon, Ionia in present day Turkey as far as colonies in Magna Graecia in present day Italy

Xenophanes also made the trip across the Aegean and Ionian seas, in his case from Colophon to Sicily, perhaps after Colophon was conquered by the Persians in 546 BC. He lived on the island (Note: "for the most part" at Zancle and Catana.) and was alleged to be at the court of Hiero I.

Many later ancient accounts associate Xenophanes with the Greek colony in the Italian city of Elea, either as the author of a poem on the founding of that city, (Note: DK 28A1) or as the founder of the Eleatic school of philosophy, or as the teacher of Parmenides. (Note: A2, A30, A31) Others associate him with Pythagoreanism. However, modern scholars generally believe that there is little historical or philosophical justification for these associations.

In his ninety-second year he was still, we have seen, leading a wandering life, which is hardly consistent with the statement that he settled at Elea and founded a school there, especially if we are to think of him as spending his last days at Hieron's court. It is very remarkable that no ancient writer expressly says he ever was at Elea, and all the evidence we have seems inconsistent with his having settled there at all.

Xenophanes is sometimes considered the first skeptic in Western philosophy and a precursor to Pyrrhonism. (Note: DK 21B49) Xeniades of Corinth was alleged to be his follower. (Note: Sextus Empiricus more than once couples him with Xenophanes.)

He relays one of the oldest stories about Pythagoras, seemingly ridiculing their doctrine of transmigration of souls: "Once they say that he was passing by when a puppy was being whipped, And he took pity and said: "Stop! Do not beat it! For it is the soul of a friend that I recognised when I heard it giving tongue." He also famously ridiculed the notion of anthropomorphic gods, "But mortals suppose that gods are born, wear their own clothers and have a voice and body." (Note: DK 21B14) and "Ethiopians say that their gods are snub-nosed and black; Thracians that theirs are blue-eyed and red-haired." (Note: DK 21B16)

It is also questioned whether Xenophanes should be considered part of an Italian school or an independent figure.

== Parmenides ==
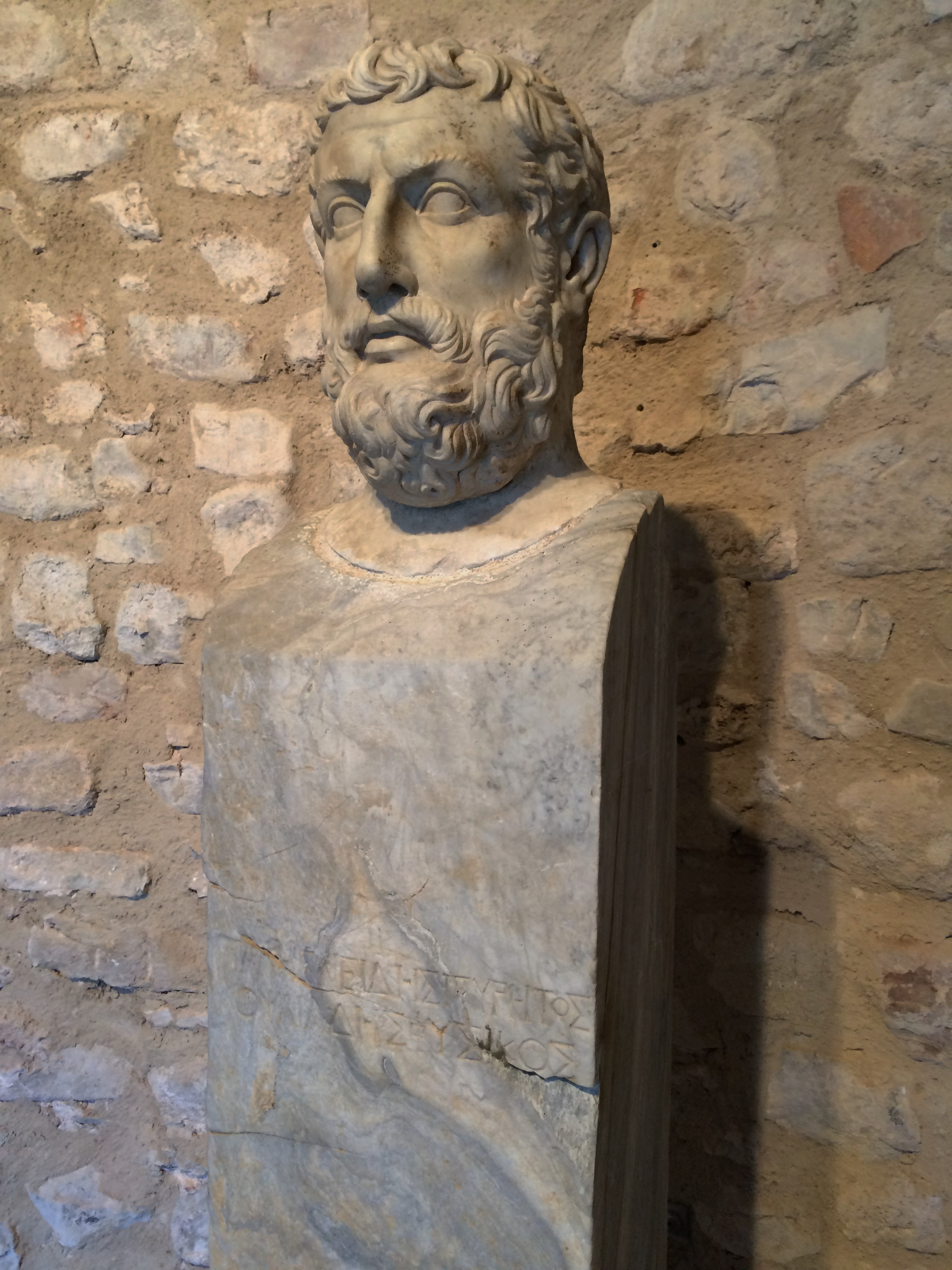
Bust of Parmenides found at Elea, thought to have been partially modeled on a Metrodorus bust.

Parmenides founded the Eleatic school in Elea, which included as followers Zeno and Melissus of Samos. According to classicist W. K. C. Guthrie, "Parmenides....is with good reason believed to have started as a philosopher of the Italian school, and to have rebelled against its teachings." According to Sotion, he was first a student of Xenophanes, (Note: The testimony of the link between Parmenides and Xenophanes goes back to Aristotle, Met. I 5, 986b (A 6) and from Plato, Sophist 242d (21 A 29)) but did not follow him, and later became associated with a Pythagorean, Aminias, whom he preferred as his teacher.

Parmenides argued that all is one and change was an illusion, contra Heraclitus. Parmenides is considered one of the most significant figures of pre-socratic philosophy, given such lofty titles as the founder of ontology and the inventor of the hypothetico-deductive method in philosophy. Attributed to him is the saying "Out of nothing, nothing comes."

Only fragments of his poem survive. In it, Parmenides prescribes two views of reality. The first, the Way of "Aletheia" or truth, describes how all reality is one, change is impossible, and existence is timeless and uniform. The second view, the way of "Doxa", or opinion, describes the world of appearances, in which one's sensory faculties lead to conceptions which are false and deceitful.

Zeno of Elea defended his master's views and argued that motion was impossible with his famous paradoxes such as the Achilles and the Arrow. Melissus, who commanded the Samian fleet in the Samian War, similarly argued all is one and unchanging.

The dialogue named Parmenides by Plato which recounts a fictionalized account of a visit that Parmenides and Zeno made to Ancient Athens in 450 BC. The dialogue called Sophist also contains Plato's response to Eleatic philosophy.

Gorgias, the sophist from Sicily and also the namesake of a dialogue by Plato, argued nothing existed and even if it did nothing can be known about it, seemingly ridiculing Melissus. Callicles from the dialogue is reckoned a follower of Gorgias.

== Empedocles ==
The pluralist and medicine man Empedocles came from Akragas, in Sicily, and is best known for originating the cosmogonic theory of the four classical elements. He also proposed forces he called Love and Strife which would mix and separate the elements. According to Galen, he also founded the Sicilian school of medicine. His followers included Acron and Pausanias. Legend holds that Empedocles committed suicide by falling into Mount Etna's volcano.

Empedocles was exiled from native town and traveled around Italy. Theophrastus relays that Empedocles was influenced by Parmenides and Pythagoras. Indeed Empedocles also founded a religious order like Pythagoras. Empedocles seems the first to treat God as an impersonal, abstract, mind, which seems to be a combination of Anaxagoras' treatment of mind (as incorporeal) and Xenophanes treatment of god (as impersonal).

== See also ==
- On Melissus, Xenophanes, and Gorgias

== Sources ==
- Barnes, Jonathan (2002). The Presocratic Philosophers.
- Burnet, John (1892). "Science and Religion". Early Greek Philosophy. A. and C. Black. pp. 83–129.
- Lesher, James H. (1992). Xenophanes of Colophon: Fragments : a Text and Translation with a Commentary. University of Toronto Press. ISBN 978-0-8020-8508-5.
