= Changes in matter =

Changes in matter may refer to:

- Chemical changes in matter
- Physical changes in matter
