= Italian school =

The Italian school refers to several different Italian schools of thought, including:

- Italian school (art)
- Italian school (philosophy)
- Italian school of algebraic geometry
- Italian school of swordsmanship
- Italian school of criminology
- Italian school of engraving
- Italian school of elitism
- Italian school of singing
