= Anaximenes of Miletus =

Ancient Greek philosopher (c. 586 – c. 526 BC)

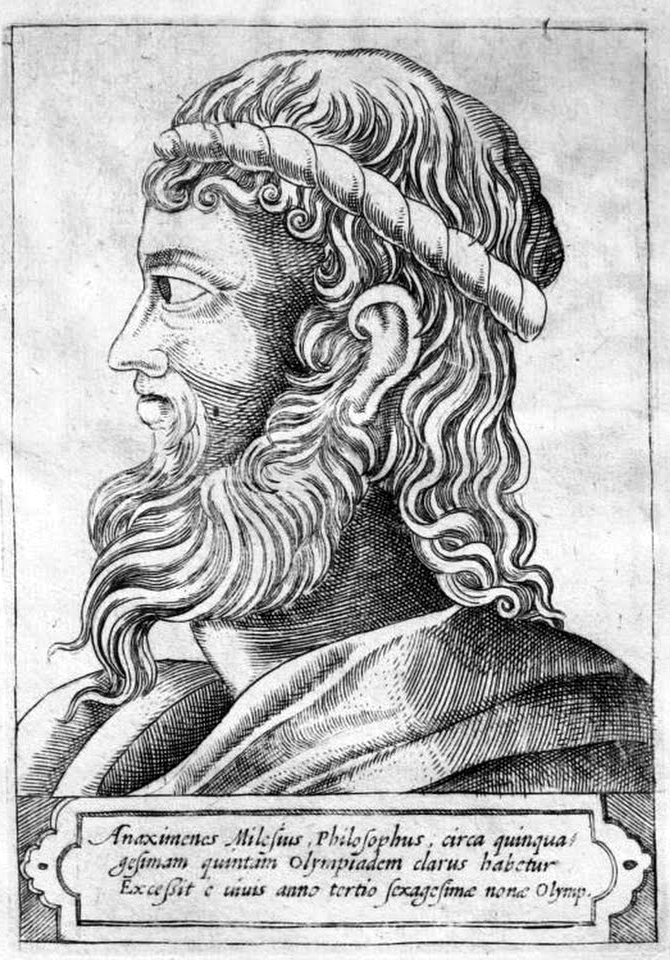
- Anaximenes of Miletus as imaginatively depicted, wearing a tainia, in a 16th-century engraving from Girolamo Olgiati
- Born: c. 586/585 BC; Miletus, Ionian League
- Died: c. 526/525 BC (aged c. 60); Miletus

Philosophical work
- Era: Pre-Socratic philosophy
- Region: Western philosophy
- School: Ionian/Milesian school
- Main interests: Metaphysics; Natural philosophy
- Notable ideas: Air is the arche Matter changes through rarefaction and condensation

Anaximenes of Miletus (/ˌænækˈsɪməˌniːz/; Ancient Greek: Ἀναξιμένης ὁ Μιλήσιος, romanized: Anaximenēs ho Milēsios; c. 586/585 – c. 526/525 BC) was a pre-Socratic Greek philosopher from Miletus in Anatolia (modern-day Turkey). He was the last of the three philosophers of the Milesian School, after Thales and Anaximander. These three are regarded by historians as the first philosophers of the Western world. Little is known of Anaximenes's life and work, as all of his original texts are lost. Historians and philosophers have reconstructed information about Anaximenes by interpreting texts about him by later writers.

Anaximenes is known for his belief that air is the arche, or the basic element of the universe from which all things are created. All three Milesian philosophers were monists who believed in a single foundational source of everything: Anaximenes believed it to be air, while Thales believed it to be water and Anaximander believed it to be apeiron, an undefined infinity. It is generally accepted that Anaximenes was instructed by Anaximander, and many of their philosophical ideas are similar. While Anaximenes was the preeminent Milesian philosopher in Ancient Greece, he is often given lower importance than the others in the modern day.

Anaximenes held that air could change into other forms through either rarefaction or condensation. Condensation would make the air denser, turning it into wind, clouds, water, earth, and finally stone. Rarefaction would make the air less dense as it eventually becomes fire. Anaximenes also developed a model of the Earth, describing it as a flat disc floating atop the air while the Sun and stars are also flat and float alongside it. He described the Sun as revolving around the Earth, causing it to be obscured by higher lands during the night. As one of the Milesian philosophers, Anaximenes was one of the earliest figures to develop science. He influenced many of the Pre-Socratic philosophers that succeeded him, such as Heraclitus, Anaxagoras, Diogenes of Apollonia, and Xenophanes. He also provided early examples of concepts such as natural science, physical change, and scientific writing.

== Biography ==
Anaximenes was born c. 586/585 BC. Surviving information about the life of Anaximenes is limited, and it comes primarily from what was preserved by Ancient Greek philosophers, particularly Aristotle and Theophrastus. According to Theophrastus, Anaximenes was the son of Eurystratus, an associate of the philosopher Anaximander, and lived in Miletus. Anaximenes is recorded as becoming a student of Anaximander. Anaximenes was likely also taught Homeric epics, Greek mythology, and Orphism, which may have influenced his philosophy through their portrayal of the classical elements. It is considered likely that he and the other Milesian philosophers were wealthy, allowing them to dedicate time to philosophy.

Anaximenes's apparent instructor, Anaximander, was a Milesian philosopher who proposed that apeiron, an undefined and boundless infinity, is the origin of all things. Anaximenes and Anaximander were two of the three Milesian philosophers, along with Thales. These were all philosophers from Miletus who were the first of the Ionian School. As the earliest known figures to have developed theories regarding the material origin of the world without a divine explanation, they are regarded as the first philosophers in the Western world. According to Diogenes Laertius, Anaximenes lived approximately from 585 to 524 BC. Anaximenes is only known to have written one full text, which may have been a response to Anaximander's text On Nature. It was described by Theophrastus as having a "simple and economical Ionic style". Anaximenes died c. 526/525 BC.

== Philosophy ==
=== Air as the arche ===
What is known about Anaximenes's philosophy is what was preserved by later philosophers, particularly Aristotle and Theophrastus. According to their writings, each philosopher of the Milesian School was a material monist who sought to discover the arche (Ancient Greek: wikt:ἀρχή, lit. 'beginning, origin'), or the one, underlying basis of all things. This is generally understood in the context of a substance, though scholars have argued that this may be anachronistic by imposing the Aristotelian notion of substance theory on earlier philosophy. Anaximenes argued that the arche is air. He described several basic elements that he considered to be manifestations of air, sorting them from least dense to most dense: fire, air, wind, clouds, water, earth, and stones. Philosophers have concluded that Anaximenes seems to have based his conclusions on naturally observable phenomena in the water cycle: the processes of rarefaction and condensation. He proposed that each substance is created by condensation to increase the density of air or by rarefaction to decrease it. The rarefaction process described by Anaximenes is often compared to felting.

Temperature was of particular importance to Anaximenes's philosophy, and he developed an early concept of the connection between temperature and density. He believed that expanded air was thinner and therefore hotter while compressed air was thicker and therefore colder—although modern science has found the opposite to be true. He derived this belief from the fact that one's breath is warm when the mouth is wide while it is cold when the air is compressed through the lips.

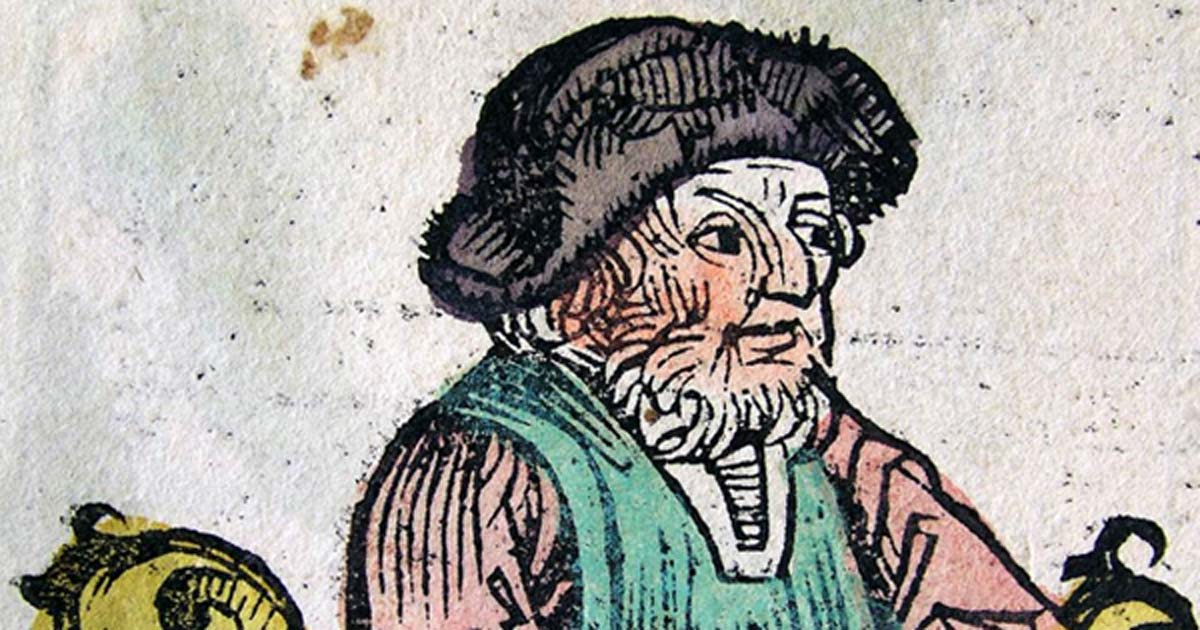
Anaximenes of Miletus as depicted in the Nuremberg Chronicle (1493)

Anaximenes further applied his concept of air as the arche to other questions. He believed in the physis, or natural world, rather than the theo, or divine world. Anaximenes considered air to be divine in a sense, but he did not associate it with deities or personification. He presented air as the first cause that propelled living systems, giving no indication that air itself was caused by anything. Anaximenes also likened the soul to air, describing it as something that is driven by breath and wills humans to act as they do. These beliefs draw a connection between the soul and the physical world, as they suggest that they are made of the same material, air. From this, Anaximenes suggested that everything, whether it be an individual soul or the entire world, operates under the same principles in which things are held together and guided by the air. In Ancient Greek, the words for wind and for soul shared a common origin.

Anaximenes's philosophy was centered on a theory of change through ongoing cycles, defined by the movement of air. These cycles consisted of opposite forces interacting with and superseding one another. This is most prominently indicated in the weather and the seasons, which alternate between hot and cold, dry and wet, or light and dark. Anaximenes did not believe that any substance could be created or destroyed, only that it could be changed from one form to another. From this belief, he proposed a model in which the qualitative traits of a substance are determined by quantitative factors.

=== Cosmology and weather ===
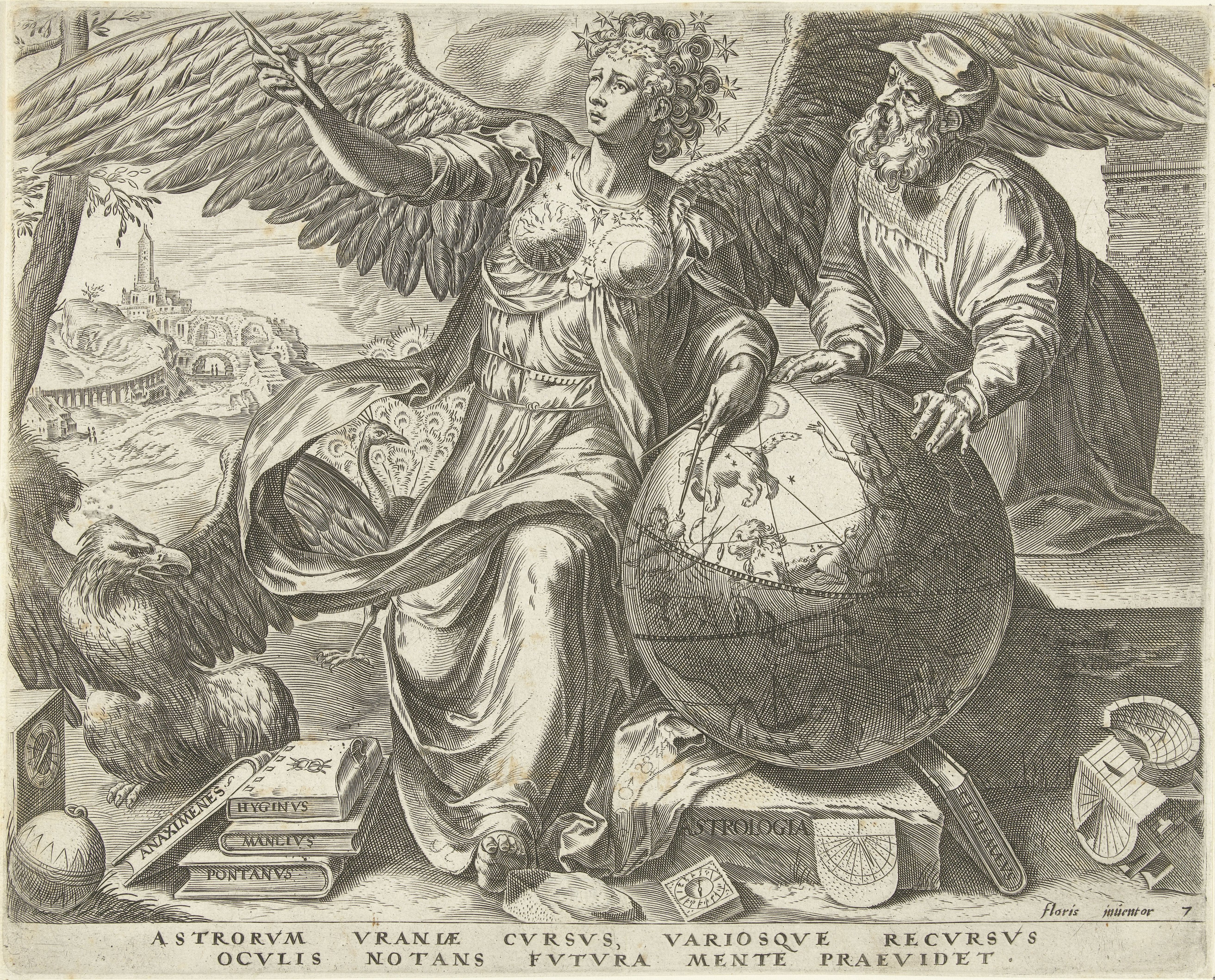
Astrology by the 16th-century Dutch engraver Cornelis Cort has a book labeled "Anaximenes" (bottom left).

Anaximenes believed that the universe was initially made entirely of air and that liquids and solids were then produced from it through condensation. He also used air to explain the nature of the Earth and the surrounding celestial bodies. He believed in a flat Earth that emerged as one of the first things to be condensed from air. This Earth is supported by the pressure of air underneath it to keep it afloat.

Anaximenes considered celestial objects to be those which had separated from the Earth. The philosophers who recorded Anaximenes's ideas disagree as to how he theorized this happened. He may have described them as evaporating or rarifying into fire. He is said to have compared the movement of the Earth, Sun, and stars to leaves floating in the wind, though he is also described as likening the stars to nails embedded in the sky. Some scholars have suggested that Anaximenes may have believed both models by distinguishing between planets and stars, which would make him the first person to do so. While the Sun is described as being a flame, Anaximenes thought it was not composed of rarefied air like the stars, but rather of Earth. According to Pseudo-Plutarch, Anaximenes thought that its burning comes not from its composition, but rather from its rapid motion.

Anaximenes rejected the commonplace idea that the Sun went underneath the Earth, instead saying that it rotated around the Earth. Hippolytus likened it to a hat spinning around a person's head. It's unknown whether this analogy was of Hippolytus's own creation or if it was part of Anaximenes's explanation. This model of the sun's movement has been interpreted in various ways by subsequent philosophers.

Anaximenes also described the causes of other natural phenomena. Like Anaximander, he believed that thunder and lightning occurred when wind emerged after being trapped in a cloud. Earthquakes, he asserted, were the result of alternating drying and wetting of the earth, causing it to undergo a cycle of splitting and swelling. He was the first philosopher to attempt a scientific explanation of rainbows, and the only one to do so until Aristotle. He described them as a reflection of sunlight off of clouds, and he theorized that the various colors were caused by an interaction of light and darkness.

=== Milesian context ===
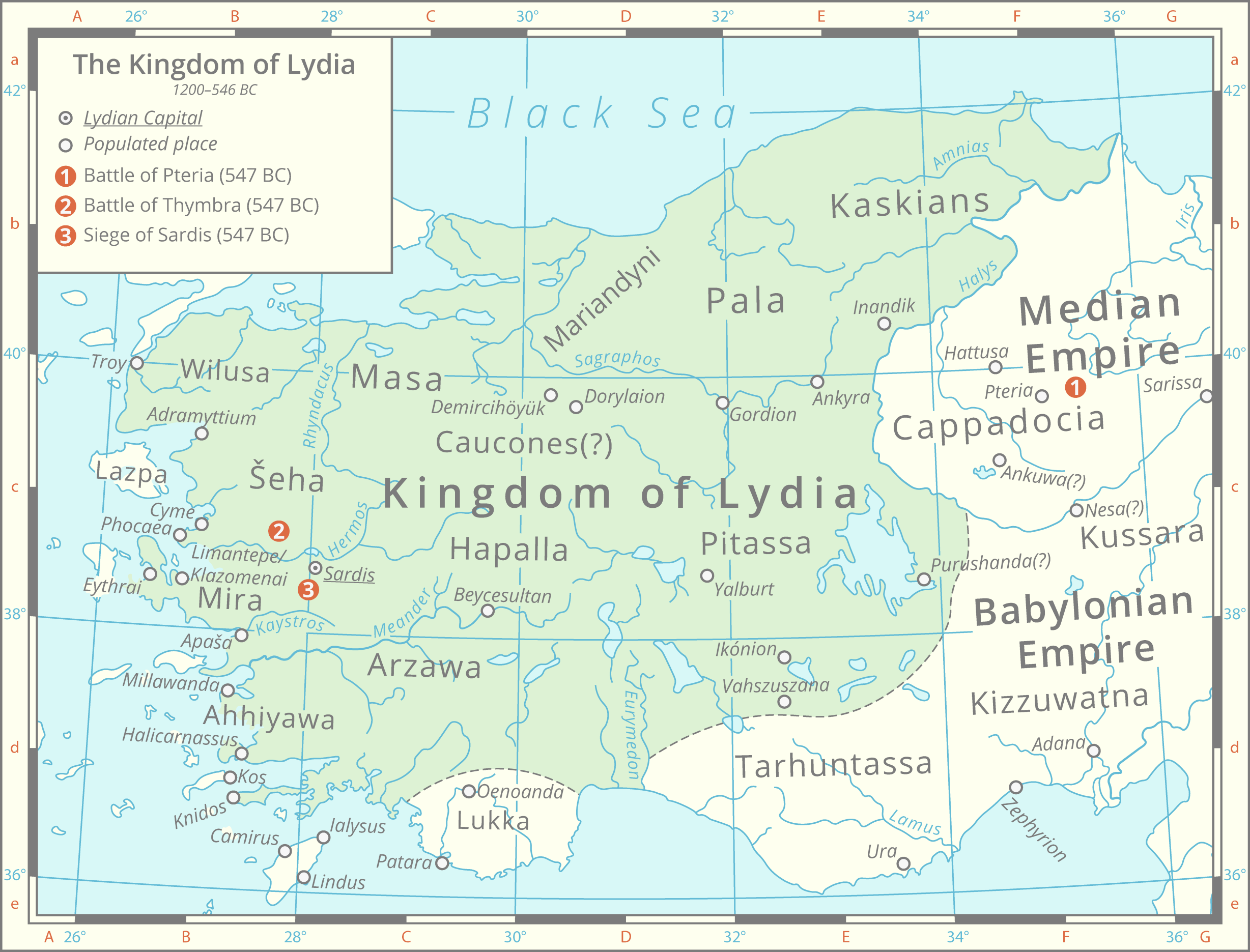
Map of Asia minor. Millawanda is Miletus

Greek settlements in Ionia

Anaximenes's views have been interpreted as reconciling those of his two predecessors, Thales and Anaximander. Air as the arche is a limitless concept, which resembled Anaximander's theory that the arche was the abstract infinite that he called apeiron (Ancient Greek: ἄπειρον, lit. 'unlimited, 'boundless'). At the same time, air as the arche was a defined substance, which resembled the theory of Thales that the arche was water. Anaximenes adopted a similar design of a flat Earth as Thales. Both proposed that the Earth was flat and that it rested on the substance they believed made up all things; Thales described a disc on water, while Anaximenes described a disc on air. His cosmology also did not diverge significantly from the ideas of Anaximander, only changing it so that it reflected his variety of monism.

Anaximenes's philosophy was founded upon that of Anaximander, but tradition holds that he was also critical of his instructor in some areas. Anaximenes also maintained that there must be an empirical explanation for why substances change from one form to another.

Anaximenes and Anaximander were similar in that they are not known to have justified why or how changes in physical things take place the way that they do. Anaximander instead invoked metaphors of justice and retribution to describe change, and he made direct appeals to deities and the divine in support of his beliefs. Anaximenes deviated from Anaximander in both of these ideas.

== Legacy and study ==
=== Influence on science and philosophy ===
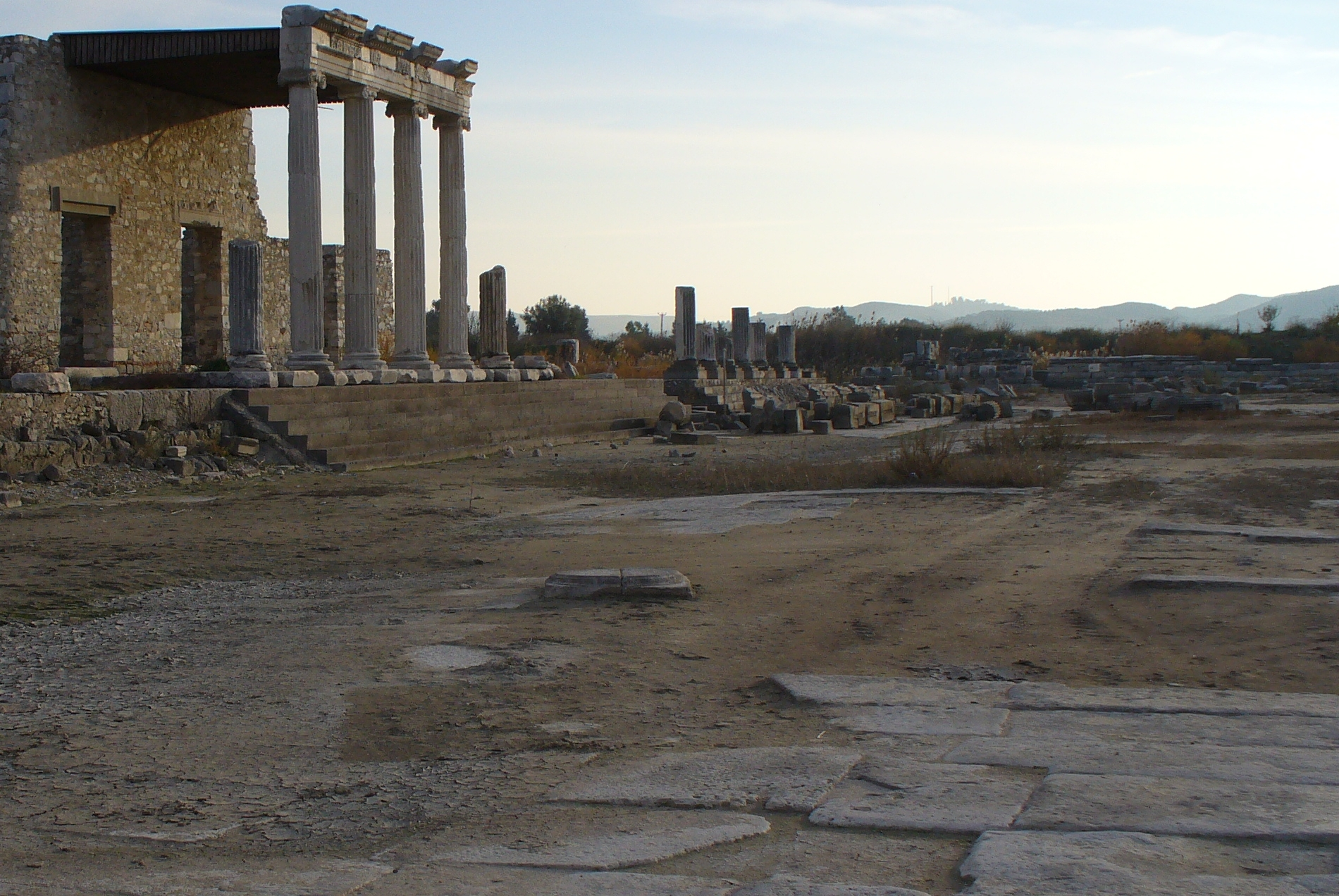
The ruins of Miletus

Anaximenes was the last of the Milesian philosophers, and Miletus was destroyed by attacking Persian forces in 494 BC. Little of his life is known compared to the other Milesian philosophers, Thales and Anaximander. These three philosophers together began what eventually became science in the Western world. In ancient Greece, the ideas of Anaximenes were well regarded in philosophy, popularized by various philosophers such as Diogenes of Apollonia, and had a greater presence than the ideas of his predecessors. The other Milesian philosophers have since overshadowed him in the study of philosophy. Anaximenes was the first philosopher to give an explanation for substances changing from one state to another through a physical process. He may also have been the first philosopher to write in descriptive prose rather than verse, developing a prototype of scientific writing. Only fragments of Anaximenes's writings have been preserved directly, and it is unknown how much these fragments have diverged from the original texts as they were recorded by subsequent authors. Further details of Anaximenes's life and philosophical views are obscure, as none of his work has been preserved, and he is only known through fragments and interpretations of him made by later writers and polemicists. The Anaximenes crater on the Moon is named in his honor.

Early medical practice developed ideas similar to Anaximenes, proposing that air was the basis of health in that it both provides life and carries disease. Anaximenes's conception of air has been likened to the atoms and subatomic particles that make up all substances through their quantitative organization. It has also been compared to the breath of life produced by God in the Old Testament. His understanding of physical properties as quantitative differences that applied at individual and universal scales became foundational ideas in the development of natural science. He was the first philosopher to analogize his philosophy in practical terms, comparing the functions of the world to behaviors that can be observed in common activities. In this manner, he was also the first to liken the function of the individual to that of the world. In this case, likening the breath that defines humans to the air that defines the world. His belief that the same properties governed the world at a human scale and a universal scale was eventually proven by Isaac Newton.

=== Subsequent interpretation ===
Some of Anaximenes's writings are referenced during the Hellenistic period, but no record of those documents currently exists. Philosophers such as Heraclitus, Anaxagoras, and Diogenes of Apollonia were all directly influenced by the work of Anaximenes. Diogenes of Apollonia adapted Anaximenes's ideas to the philosophy of Stoicism. The ideas ridiculed in the Aristophanes play The Clouds originated from the ideas of Anaximander and Anaximenes. Philosophers such as Xenophanes later adopted Anaximenes's model of cosmology. Xenophanes's theory that the arche is earth and water has also been interpreted as a response to Anaximenes.

Plato referenced the concept of air as the cause of thought in the Phaedo, rejecting it with the argument that one's physical state does not determine their fate. In the Timaeus, Plato favorably mentions Anaximenes's theory of matter and its seven states from stone to fire. Aristotle was critical of the ideas of Anaximenes. In his Metaphysics, Aristotle characterized Anaximenes and his predecessors as monists, those who believe that all things are composed of a single substance. This description came to be widely accepted in philosophy. Practitioners of Aristotelian philosophy further considered Anaximenes to be a founder of naturalism. After Aristotle, Theophrastus continued the doxography of the Milesian philosophers and other Ionians. He described Anaximenes as a natural philosopher. Other ancient philosophers who analyzed the work of Anaximenes include Simplicius, Aetius, Hippolytus, and Plutarch.

Georg Wilhelm Friedrich Hegel said that Anaximenes was the first philosopher to transfer the ideas of natural philosophy into the philosophy of consciousness. Werner Heisenberg said that the philosophy of Anaximenes caused a setback in scientific understanding, as it moved analysis away from physical properties themselves. Karl Popper suggested that Anaximenes and Anaximander developed a philosophy of rationalist critique, allowing criticism of one's teacher, that was not revived until the Renaissance.
