= McKirahan =

McKirahan is a surname. Notable people with this surname include:

- Andrew McKirahan (born 1990), American former professional baseball pitcher
- Richard McKirahan, American philosopher and professor
