= Archelaus (philosopher) =

5th-century BC Greek philosopher

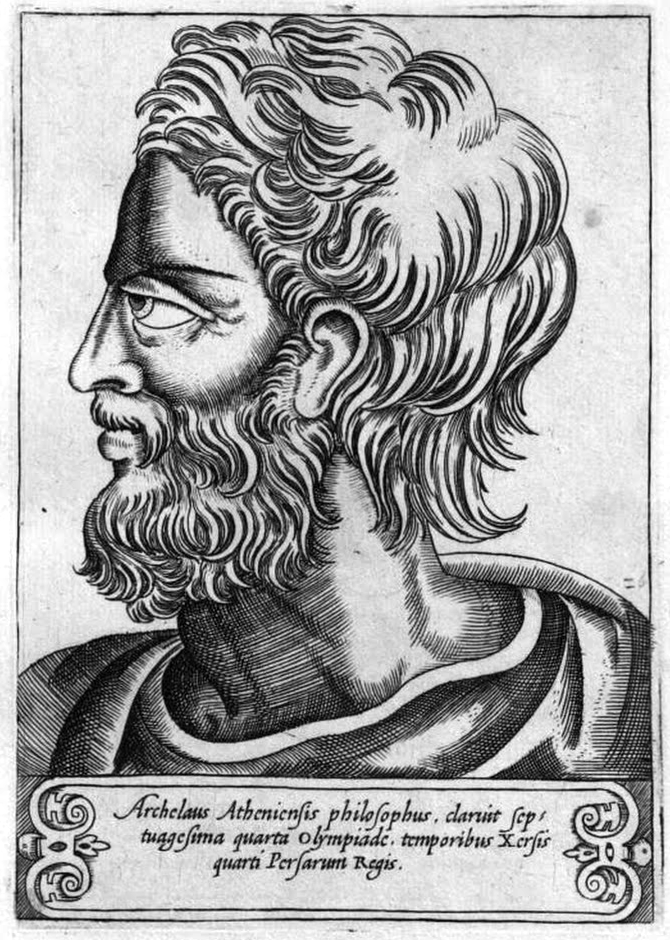
- Born: c. 5th century BC; Athens or Miletus
- Died: c. 5th century BC

Philosophical work
- Era: Ancient philosophy
- Region: Western philosophy
- School: Pluralist school

Archelaus (/ɑːrkɪˈleɪəs/; Greek: Ἀρχέλαος; fl. 5th century BC) was a Greek philosopher, a pupil of Anaxagoras, and may have been a teacher of Socrates. He asserted that the principle of motion was the separation of hot from cold, from which he endeavoured to explain the formation of the Earth and the creation of animals and humans.

== Life ==
Archelaus was a philosopher of the Ionian School, called Physicus from having been the first to teach natural philosophy at Athens. This statement of Diogenes Laërtius, is contradicted by Clement of Alexandria, but the two may be reconciled by supposing that Archelaus was the first Athenian who did so. According to Simplicius, who probably got his information from Theophrastus, Archelaus was a native of Athens, even though Diogenes Laërtius says it is unclear if he was born in Athens or Miletus. He was the son of Apollodorus, or as some say, of Mydon, Midon, or Myson; was a pupil of Anaxagoras; and is said to have taught at Lampsacus before he established himself at Athens. He is commonly reported to have taught Socrates and Euripides. If he was the instructor of Socrates, he is never mentioned by Xenophon, Plato, or Aristotle, and this story may have been an attempt to connect Socrates with the Ionian School. However, Diogenes Laërtius does report, on the authority of Ion of Chios, a contemporary of Socrates, that Socrates went with Archelaus on a trip to Samos. Also, some scholars have seen in Socrates' "autobiographical" sketch in Plato's Phaedo a reference to Archelaus' theory about the generation and nourishment of the first animals. The tradition which connects Archelaus with Euripides may have arisen from a confusion with Euripides' patron, Archelaus I, king of Macedonia.

== Philosophy ==
No fragments of Archelaus have survived; his doctrines have to be extracted from Diogenes Laërtius, Simplicius, Pseudo-Plutarch, and Hippolytus.

Archelaus held that air and infinity are the principle of all things, by which Pseudo-Plutarch supposes that he meant infinite air; and we are told that by this statement he intended to exclude Mind from the creation of the world. If so, he abandoned the doctrine of Anaxagoras at its most important point; and it seems safer to conclude that while he wished to teach the materialist notion that the mind is formed of air, he still held infinite Mind to be the cause of all things. This explanation has the advantage of agreeing with Simplicius.

Beginning with primitive Matter (identical with air mingled with Mind), by a process of thickening and thinning, arose cold and warmth, or water and fire, the one passive, the other active. Archelaus deduced motion from the opposition of heat and cold, caused by the will of the material Mind. This opposition separated fire and water, and produced a slimy mass of earth. While the earth was hardening, the action of heat upon its moisture gave birth to animals, which at first were nourished by the mud from which they sprang, and gradually acquired the power of propagating their species. Humans also appear, at first in lower forms. All these animals were endowed with mind, but humans separated from the others, and established laws and societies. It was just from this point of his physical theory that he seems to have passed into ethical speculation, by the proposition that right and wrong are "not by nature but by custom" (Greek: οὐ φύσει ἀλλὰ νόμῳ)—dogma possibly suggested to him by the contemporary Sophists.

Of the other doctrines of Archelaus, he asserted that the Earth was flat, but that the surface must be depressed towards the centre; for if it were absolutely level, the sun would rise and set everywhere at the same time. He also said that the Sun was the largest of the stars. He accounted for speech by the motion of the air; for this, he seems to have adopted the views of Anaxagoras.

== Sources ==
- Hippolytus (1886). "Chapter 8. Archelaus; System Akin to that of Anaxagoras; His Origin of the Earth and of Animals; Other Systems". Refutation of All Heresies (Book I). Translated by John Henry MacMahon. — From Roberts, Alexander; Donaldson, James; Coxe, A. Cleveland, eds. (1886). Ante-Nicene Fathers. Vol. 5. Buffalo, NY: Christian Literature Publishing Company.

Attribution
