= Girolamo Olgiati =

Italian engraver and printmaker

Girolamo Olgiati (active c. 1567–1574) was an Italian engraver and printmaker active during the late Renaissance, primarily based in Venice. He is best known for his detailed engravings, which often reproduced works by prominent artists of his time, as well as his contributions to the dissemination of classical and humanist themes in print.

== Life and career ==
Little is known about Olgiati’s personal life, including his exact birth and death dates. His career as an engraver flourished in Venice during the late 16th century, a period when printmaking played a significant role in spreading Renaissance art and ideas across Europe.

Olgiati’s work was heavily influenced by the artistic and intellectual climate of Venice, which was a major center for art and publishing. His engravings frequently reproduced compositions by masters such as Titian and Cornelis Cort, making their works accessible to a broader audience.

=== The Annunciation (c. 1567–1575) ===
This engraving is based on a composition by Titian and was published by the Venetian printer Donato Rasicotti. It is widely regarded as one of Olgiati’s most technically accomplished works, showcasing his ability to translate complex paintings into detailed and expressive engravings.

=== Creation of Eve (1574) ===
Inspired by Cornelis Cort, this engraving highlights Olgiati’s skill in interpreting the works of other artists while maintaining a distinctive stylistic approach. The work demonstrates his technical expertise and the influence of the broader Venetian engraving tradition.

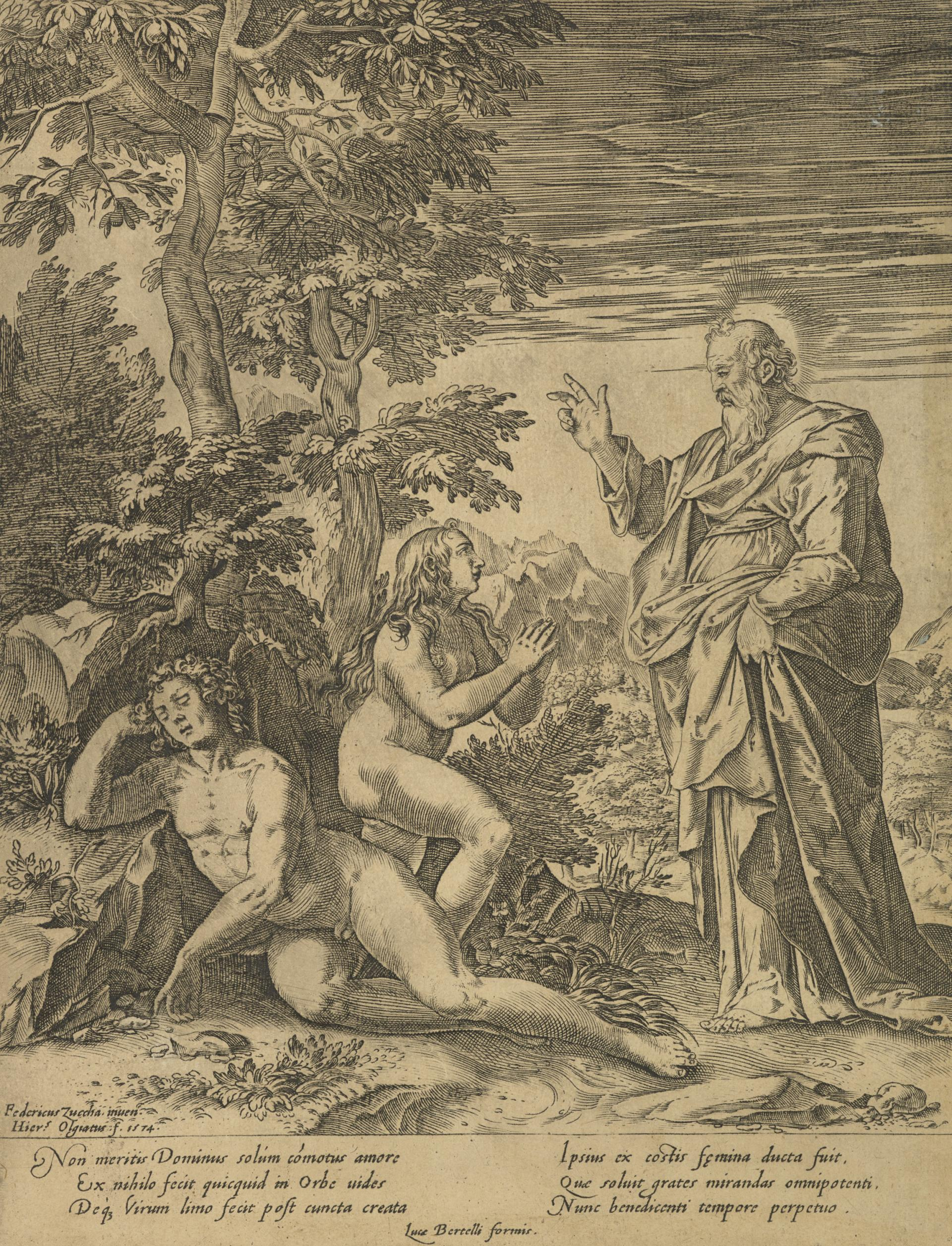
“Creation of Eve” by Girolamo Olgiati, courtesy of the National Galleries of Scotland.

The engraving depicts the biblical scene of Eve's creation and reflects the Renaissance emphasis on classical forms and religious themes. The work is part of Olgiati’s broader exploration of combining artistic innovation with traditional subject matter, showcasing his ability to blend detail and expression in his engravings.

=== Illustrium philosophorum, et sapientum effigies ab eorum numismatibus extractae (1583) ===
This collection features engraved portraits of ancient Greek and Roman philosophers and sages, based on depictions from classical coins. The work reflects the Renaissance humanist fascination with classical antiquity and the revival of ancient scholarship, making it a significant contribution to the intellectual and artistic culture of the period.

One notable engraving from this collection is Olgiati’s depiction of Pyrrho of Elis, an influential philosopher known for his role in the development of skepticism in ancient Greece. The engraving, like others in the collection, is an imaginative reconstruction, rendered in the Renaissance artistic style.

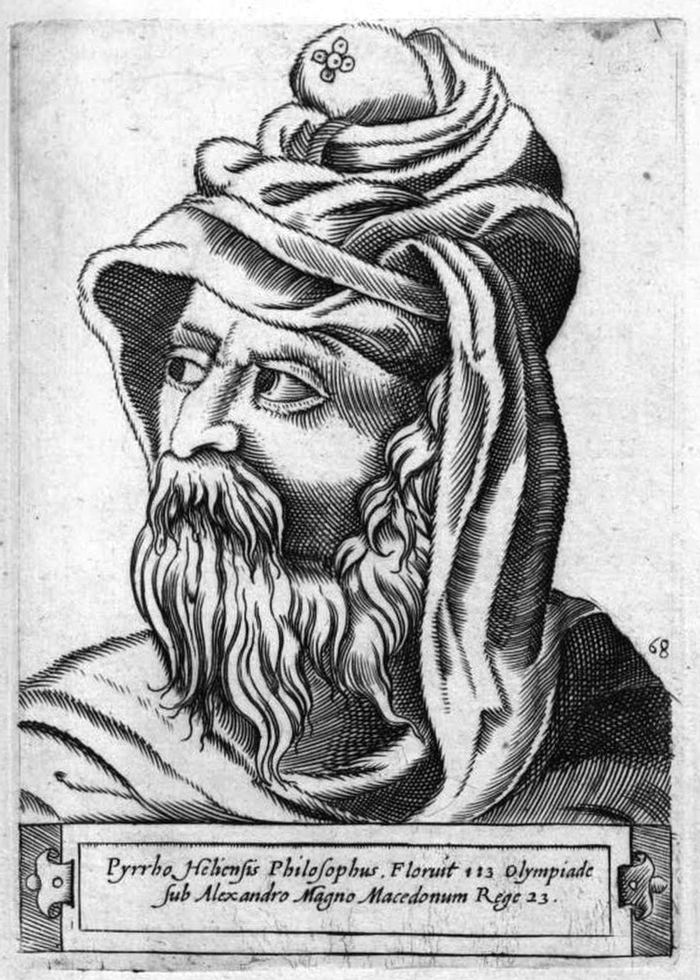
Imaginary engraving of Pyrrho of Elis from *Illustrium philosophorum et sapientum effigies ab eorum numismatibus extractae*. Courtesy of Wikimedia Commons.

== Artistic contributions ==
Olgiati’s engravings are valued for their precision and artistry, as well as their role in disseminating Renaissance compositions to collectors, scholars, and artists. His work contributed to the broader appreciation of the Italian Renaissance, particularly through his reproductions of works by prominent artists.

His engravings also played a role in the study of classical antiquity, as seen in his portrayal of ancient figures based on coinage. This combination of artistic skill and historical interest positioned Olgiati among the notable printmakers of his era.

Olgiati’s engravings are also notable for their imaginative depictions of classical and historical figures. One example is his portrayal of the Pre-Socratic philosopher Anaximenes of Miletus, featured in the collection Illustrium philosophorum, et sapientum effigies ab eorum numismatibus extractae. This engraving, like others in the collection, reimagines ancient figures with Renaissance artistic conventions, emphasizing their wisdom and intellectual stature.

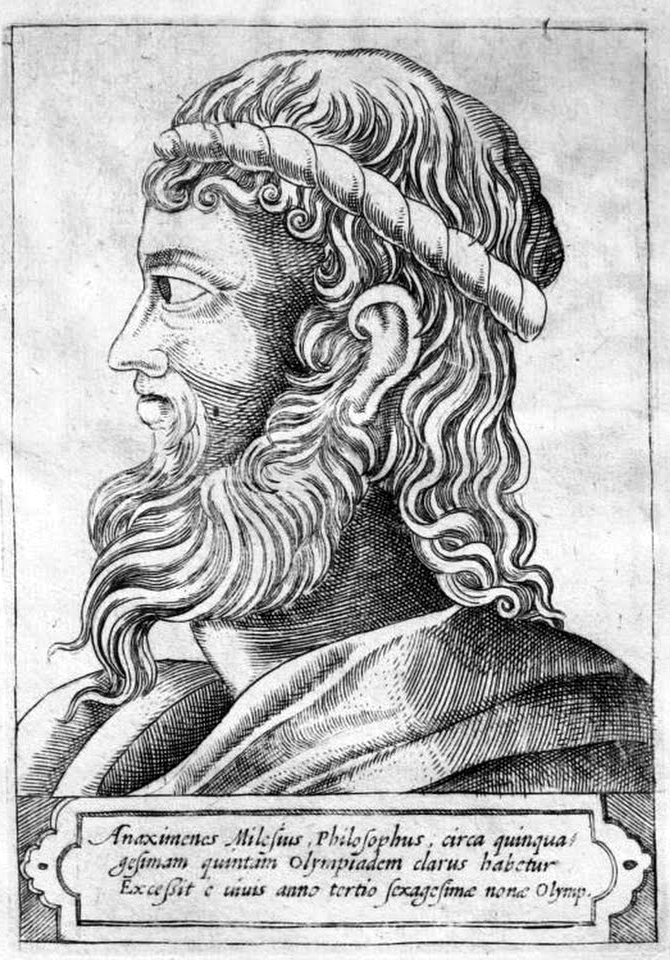
An imaginative engraving of Anaximenes of Miletus from Olgiati’s collection *Illustrium philosophorum, et sapientum effigies ab eorum numismatibus extractae*.

== Legacy ==
Although not as widely recognized as some of his contemporaries, Olgiati’s work remains significant in the history of printmaking. His engravings are preserved in major collections, including the Philadelphia Museum of Art and the National Galleries of Scotland. Scholars continue to study his contributions to the spread of Renaissance art and ideas.
