= Metrodorus of Chios =

4th-century BC Greek philosopher

Metrodorus of Chios (Ancient Greek: Μητρόδωρος ὁ Χῖος; fl. 4th century BC) was a Greek philosopher, belonging to the school of Democritus, and an important forerunner of Epicurus.

Metrodorus was a pupil of Nessos of Chios, or, as some accounts prefer, of Democritus himself. He is said to have taught Diogenes of Smyrna, who, in turn, taught Anaxarchus.

Metrodorus was a complete sceptic. He accepted the Democritean theory of atoms and void and the plurality of worlds. He also held a theory of his own that the stars are formed from day to day by the moisture in the air under the heat of the Sun. According to Cicero he said, "We know nothing, no, not even whether we know or not" and maintained that everything is to each person only what it appears to him to be. Metrodorus is especially interesting as a forerunner of Anaxarchus, and as a connecting link between atomism proper and the later scepticism.

The following quote is attributed to him. If accurate, it demonstrates that Metrodorus had a cosmological philosophy that was advanced for the ancient world: "A single ear of wheat in a large field is as strange as a single world in infinite space."
