= Ionian school (philosophy) =

Greek philosophy centred in Miletus, Ionia in the 6th and 5th centuries BCE

Greek settlements in Asia Minor. Ionia in green.

The Ionian school of pre-Socratic philosophy refers to Ancient Greek philosophers, or a school of thought, in Ionia in the 6th century BC, the first in the Western tradition.

The Ionian school included such thinkers as Thales of Miletus, Anaximander, Anaximenes of Miletus, Heraclitus, Anaxagoras, and Archelaus. This classification can be traced to the doxographer Sotion. The doxographer Diogenes Laërtius divides pre-Socratic philosophy into the Ionian and Italian school. The collective affinity of the Ionians was first acknowledged by Aristotle who called them physiologoi (φυσιολόγοι), or natural philosophers. They are sometimes referred to as cosmologists, since they studied stars and maths, gave cosmogonies and were largely physicalists who tried to explain the nature of matter.

The first three philosophers (Thales, Anaximander, and Anaximenes) were all centred in the mercantile city of Miletus on the Maeander River and are collectively referred to as the Milesian school. They sought to explain nature by finding its fundamental element called the arche. They seemed to think although matter could change from one form to another, all matter had something in common that did not change. Aristotle thus characterized them as material monists. They also believed that life permeated everything in the cosmos, i.e., they were hylozoists. The Milesians disagreed on what all things had in common, and did not seem to experiment to find out, but used abstract reasoning rather than religion or mythology to arrive at their positions, and are thus credited as the first philosophers.

== Thales ==
Thales (Greek: Θαλῆς, Thalēs) of Miletus (c. 624 – c. 546 BCE) is regarded as the earliest Western philosopher. Before him, the Greeks explained the origin and nature of the world through myths of anthropomorphic gods and heroes. Phenomena like lightning and earthquakes were attributed to the actions of the gods. By contrast, Thales attempted to find naturalistic explanations of the world without referencing the supernatural. He explained earthquakes by imagining that the Earth floats on water and earthquakes occur when waves rock the Earth. Thales' most famous belief was his cosmological doctrine, which held that the world originated from water.

Aristotle wrote in Metaphysics, "Thales, the founder of this school of philosophy [Ionian school], says the permanent entity is water (which is why he also propounded that the earth floats on water). Presumably he derived this assumption from seeing the nutriment of everything is moist, and that heat itself is generated from moisture and depends upon it for its existence (and that from which a thing is generated is always its first principle). He derived his assumption, then, from this; and also from the fact that the seeds of everything have a moist nature, whereas water is the first principle of the nature of moist things."

== Anaximander ==
Anaximander (Greek: Ἀναξίμανδρος, Anaximandros) (c. 610 – c. 546 BCE) wrote a cosmological work, little of which remains. From the few extant fragments, we learn that he believed the beginning or first principle (arche, a word first found in Anaximander's writings, and which he probably invented) is an endless, unlimited mass (apeiron), subject to neither old age nor decay, which perpetually yields fresh materials from which everything we can perceive is derived.

== Anaximenes ==
Anaximenes of Miletus (Greek: Ἀναξιμένης ὁ Μιλήσιος; c. 585 – c. 528 BCE), like others in his school of thought, practiced material monism and believed that air is the arche.

== Heraclitus ==
Heraclitus (Greek: Ἡράκλειτος, Hērakleitos) of Ephesus (c. 535 – c. 475 BCE) disagreed with Thales, Anaximander, and Pythagoras about the nature of the ultimate substance and claimed instead that everything is derived from the Greek classical element fire, rather than from air, water, or earth. This led to the belief that change is real and stability illusory. For Heraclitus, "Everything flows, nothing stands still." He is famous for saying: "No man can cross the same river twice, because neither the man nor the river are the same."

== Anaxagoras ==
Anaxagoras (Greek: Ἀναξαγόρας) of Clazomenae (c. 510 – c. 428 BCE) regarded material substance as an infinite multitude of imperishable primary elements, referring all generation and disappearance to mixture and separation respectively. All substance is ordered by an ordering force, the cosmic mind (nous).

== Archelaus ==
Archelaus (Greek: Ἀρχέλαος, Arkhelaos) was a Greek philosopher of the 5th century BCE, born probably in Athens. He was a pupil of Anaxagoras and is said by Ion of Chios (Diogenes Laërtius, ii. 23) to have been the teacher of Socrates. Some argue that this is probably only an attempt to connect Socrates with the Ionian school; others (e.g., Gomperz, Greek Thinkers) uphold the story. There is a similar opinion regarding the statement that Archelaus formulated certain ethical doctrines. In general, he followed Anaxagoras, but in his cosmology, he returned to the earlier Ionians.

== See also ==
- History of naturalism
- Mechanism (philosophy)
- Thales of Miletus § Mathematics
