= Iccus of Taranto =

Ancient Greek athlete and philosopher

Iccus of Taranto (Ancient Greek: Ἴκκος) (5th century BC) was a Magna Graecia Olympic athlete, a victor during the 84th Games (444 BC) or 70th Games (470 BC) according to older sources. He is considered the father of athletic dietology. He prepared himself physically before competing according to ethical-religious Pythagorean concepts by abstaining from sexual intercourse and consuming a specially prepared frugal diet. He also taught these principles. Pausanias calls him the best gymnast of his age, and Plato also mentions him with great praise.

Iamblichus calls him a Pythagorean. According to Themistius, Plato reckoned him among the sophists. Specifically, in Plato's dialogue Protagoras, the sophist Protagoras lists Iccus alongside Homer, Hesiod, Simonides, Orpheus, Musaeus, Herodicus, Agathocles tutor of Damon, and Pythoclides as fellow sophists (that is, improvers of youth) who chose to present themselves as poets, athletes, or musicians for fear of public disapproval.
