= On Melissus, Xenophanes, and Gorgias =

Work traditionally ascribed to Aristotle

On Melissus, Xenophanes, and Gorgias (Ancient Greek: Περὶ Μελίσσου, Ξενοφάνους καὶ Γοργίου; Latin: De Melisso, Xenophane, Gorgia) is a short work falsely attributed to Aristotle. The work was likely written during the 1st century CE or later by a member of the peripatetic school.

== Modern Criticism ==
Jaap Mansfeld argues that the work's style of argumentation may have been influenced by the Pyrrhonist modes of Agrippa the Skeptic.

== See also ==
- Melissus
- Xenophanes
- Gorgias
