= Anaxarchus =

4th-century BC Greek philosopher

Anaxarchus (/ˌænəɡˈzɑːrkəs/; Greek: Ἀνάξαρχος; c. 380 – c. 320 BC) was a Greek philosopher of the school of Democritus. Together with Pyrrho, he accompanied Alexander the Great into Asia. The reports of his philosophical views suggest that he was a forerunner of the Greek skeptics.

== Life ==
Anaxarchus was born at Abdera in Thrace. He was the companion and friend of Alexander the Great in his Asiatic campaigns. His relationship with Alexander, however, was ambiguous, owing to contradictory sources. Some paint Anarxchus as a flatterer, among them Plutarch, who tells a story that at Bactra, in 327 BC in a debate with Callisthenes, Anaxarchus advised all to worship Alexander as a god even during his lifetime. In contrast, others paint Anaxarchus as scathingly ironic towards the monarch. According to Diogenes Laertius, in response to Alexander's claim to have been the son of Zeus-Ammon, Anaxarchus pointed to his bleeding wound and remarked, "See the blood of a mortal, not ichor, such as flows from the veins of the immortal gods."

When Alexander was trying to show that he was divine so that the Greeks would perform proskynesis to him, Anaxarchus said that Alexander could "more justly be considered a god than Dionysus or Heracles".

Diogenes Laertius says that Anaxarchus earned the enmity of Nicocreon, the tyrant of Cyprus, with an inappropriate joke against tyrants in a banquet in Tyre in 331 BC. Later, when Anaxarchus was forced to land in Cyprus against his will, Nicocreon ordered him to be pounded to death in a mortar. The philosopher endured this torture with fortitude, and even taunted the king: "[You merely] pound away at the bag of Anaxarchus; you are not pounding Anaxarchus [himself]!" When Nicocreon threatened to cut out his tongue, Anaxarchus instead bit it off himself, and spat it in the tyrant's face.

According to Diogenes Laertius, Anaxarchus was known as the “Happy Man” (Eudaimonikos) because of his fortitude and contentment in life.

== Philosophy ==
Very little is known about his philosophical views. It is thought that he represents a link between the atomism of Democritus, and the skepticism of his own apprentice Pyrrho. He also shares ethical traits with the Cynic and Cyrenaic schools.

Anaxarchus is said to have studied under Diogenes of Smyrna, who in turn studied under Metrodorus of Chios, who used to declare that he knew nothing, not even the fact that he knew nothing. According to Sextus Empiricus, Anaxarchus "compared existing things to a scene-painting and supposed them to resemble the impressions experienced in sleep or madness." It was under the influence of Anaxarchus that Pyrrho is said to have adopted "a most noble philosophy, . . . taking the form of agnosticism and suspension of judgement." Anaxarchus is said to have praised Pyrrho's "indifference and sang-froid." He is said to have possessed "fortitude and contentment in life," which earned him the epithet eudaimonikos ("fortunate").

His skepticism seems to have been pragmatical, postulating that against the uncertainty of existence, the only viable stance is to pursue happiness or eudaimonia, for which it is necessary to cultivate indifference or adiaphora. According to him, the effort to differentiate truth from falseness through the senses is both useless and detrimental to happiness.

He wrote a work named About the Monarchs. In it, he espouses the view that breadth of knowledge can be both beneficial and detrimental: one who speaks without considering whether the remarks are appropriate to the situation cannot truly be called wise, however knowledgeable they may otherwise be.

Plutarch reports that he told Alexander the Great that there was an infinite number of worlds, causing the latter to become dejected because he had not yet conquered even one.
