= Nessos of Chios =

Nessos of Chios (Ancient Greek: Νεσσᾶς or Νέσσος ὁ Χῖος) was a pre-Socratic ancient Greek philosopher from the island of Chios.

== Biography ==
Little is known about the life and work of Nessos. The only thing that is known that was Democritus philosophy and the compatriot Metrodorus was his student. That is supported in commentaries of interpretations of Homeric and Hesiod works.
