= Physical change =

Change which affects the form of an object/substance, but not its chemical composition

Physical changes are changes affecting the form of a chemical substance, but not its chemical composition. Physical changes are used to separate mixtures into their component compounds, but can not usually be used to separate compounds into chemical elements or simpler compounds.

Physical changes occur when objects or substances undergo a change that does not change their chemical composition. This contrasts with the concept of chemical change in which the composition of a substance changes or one or more substances combine or break up to form new substances. In general a physical change is reversible using physical means. For example, salt dissolved in water can be recovered by allowing the water to evaporate.

A physical change involves a change in physical properties. Examples of physical properties include melting, transition to a gas, change of strength, change of durability, changes to crystal form, textural change, shape, size, color, volume and density.

An example of a physical change is the process of tempering steel to form a knife blade. A steel blank is repeatedly heated and hammered which changes the hardness of the steel, its flexibility and its ability to maintain a sharp edge.

Many physical changes also involve the rearrangement of atoms most noticeably in the formation of crystals. Many chemical changes are irreversible, and many physical changes are reversible, but reversibility is not a certain criterion for classification. Although chemical changes may be recognized by an indication such as odor, color change, or production of a gas, every one of these indicators can result from physical change.

== Examples ==
=== Heating and cooling ===
Many elements and some compounds change from solids to liquids and from liquids to gases when heated and the reverse when cooled. Some substances such as iodine and carbon dioxide go directly from solid to gas in a process called sublimation.

=== Magnetism ===
Ferro-magnetic materials can become magnetic. The process is reversible and does not affect the chemical composition.

=== Crystalisation ===
Many elements and compounds form crystals. Some such as carbon can form several different forms including diamond, graphite, graphene and fullerenes including buckminsterfullerene.

Crystals in metals have a major effect of the physical properties of the metal including strength and ductility. Crystal type, shape and size can be altered by physical hammering, rolling and by heat

=== Mixtures ===
Mixtures of substances that are not soluble are usually readily separated by physical sieving or settlement. However mixtures can have different properties from the individual components. One familiar example is the mixture of fine sand with water used to make sandcastles. Neither the sand on its own nor the water on its own will make a sand-castle but by using physical properties of surface tension, the mixture behaves in a different way.

=== Solutions ===
Most solutions of salts and some compounds such as sugars can be separated by evaporation. Others such as mixtures or volatile liquids such as low molecular weight alcohols, can be separated by fractional distillation.

=== Alloys ===
The mixing of different metal elements is known as alloying. Brass is an alloy of copper and zinc. Separating individual metals from an alloy can be difficult and may require chemical processing – making an alloy is an example of a physical change that cannot readily be undone by physical means. Alloys where mercury is one of the metals can be separated physically by melting the alloy and boiling the mercury off as a vapour.

== See also ==
- Chemical change
- Process (science)
- Physical property
