= Richard McKirahan =

American philosopher

Philosophical work
- Era: 21st-century philosophy
- Region: Western philosophy
- Institutions: Pomona College

Richard D. McKirahan Jr. is an American philosopher and Edwin Clarence Norton Professor of Classics and Professor of Philosophy at Pomona College in Claremont, California. He is known for his works on Pre-Socratics.

== Early life and education ==
McKirahan attended the University of California, Berkeley and the University of Oxford as a Marshall Scholar before completing his doctorate at Harvard University.

== Career ==
McKirahan began teaching at Pomona in 1987. He is the president of the Society for Ancient Greek Philosophy, a position he has held since 2012.

== Books ==
- —— (1992). Principles and Proofs: Aristotle's Theory of Demonstrative Species. Princeton University Press. ISBN 9780691629872.
- —— (1994). Philosophy Before Socrates: An Introduction with Texts and Commentary. Indianapolis: Hackett. ISBN 978-1-60384-182-5.
- Curd, Patricia, ed. (1996). A PreSocratics Reader: Selected Fragments and Testimonia. Translated by ——; Curd, Patricia. Indianapolis: Hackett. ISBN 9781603843058.
