= Asia Minor Greeks =

Ethnic Greeks native to Asia Minor

Μικρασιάτες Mikrasiates
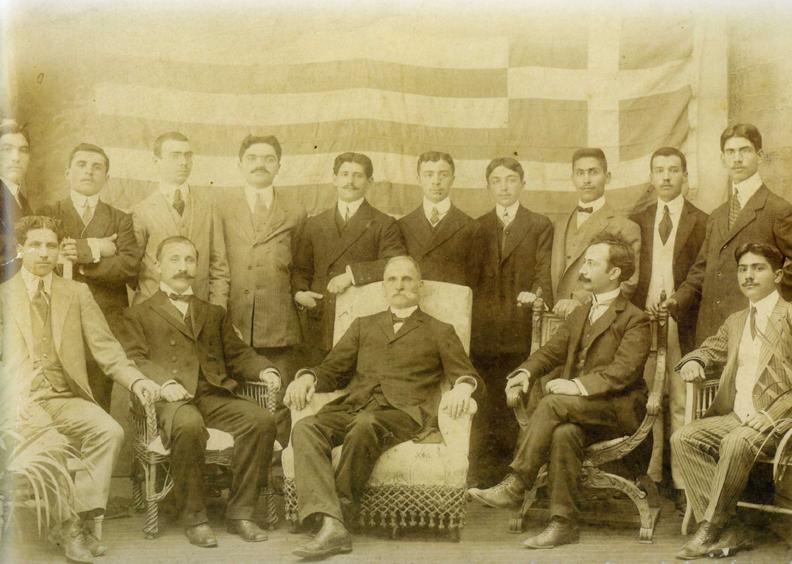
- Asia Minor Greek Teachers and Graduates from the Evangelical School of Smyrna

Regions with significant populations
- Historically Asia Minor, present day Greece

Languages
- Demotic Greek; Asia Minor Greek (including Cappadocian and Pontic Greek); Propontis Tsakonian Greek other languages (diaspora)

Religion
- Greek Orthodox Church

Related ethnic groups
- Byzantines, Rum millet, Ottoman Greeks, Greeks, Mariupol Greeks, Urums, Tsakonians

Asia Minor Greeks, Anatolian Greeks or Mikrasiates (Greek: Μικρασιάτες, romanized: Mikrasiates) are the Greek populations who lived in Asia Minor from the 13th century BC until the 1923 population exchange between Greece and Turkey according to the Treaty of Lausanne, in the aftermath of World War I and the Greco-Turkish War (1919-1922).

Most Asia Minor Greeks were expelled to Greece in 1922/1923. Today, many Greeks descending from Asia Minor Greek refugees live all over Greece and the diaspora. Greeks in present day Turkey form a small minority, mostly living in Istanbul.

== Historical context ==
Linguistic map of the Roman Empire c. 400

The Byzantine Empire at the death of Basil II in 1025

=== Ancient Greek ===
- Iron Age Greek migrations
- Aeolis
- Ionia
- Ionian League
- Doric Hexapolis
- Greek colonization and Pontic colonies (classical antiquity)
- Ionian Revolt
- Delian League
- Spartan hegemony
- Hellenic League
- Empire of Alexander the Great

=== Hellenistic ===
- Antigonid dynasty
- Seleucid Empire
- Ptolemaic Empire
- Lysimachus' kingdom
- Kingdom of Pergamon
- Kingdom of Pontus
- Kingdom of Bithynia
- Kingdom of Cappadocia
- Hellenistic Anatolia (Hellenistic era)

=== East Roman ===
- Romanization of Anatolia (Roman era)
- Greek East and Latin West
- Byzantine Empire
- Byzantine Anatolia (Middle Ages)
- Empire of Nicaea
- Empire of Trebizond

=== Ottoman ===
- Rum millet
- Ottoman Greeks (early modern)

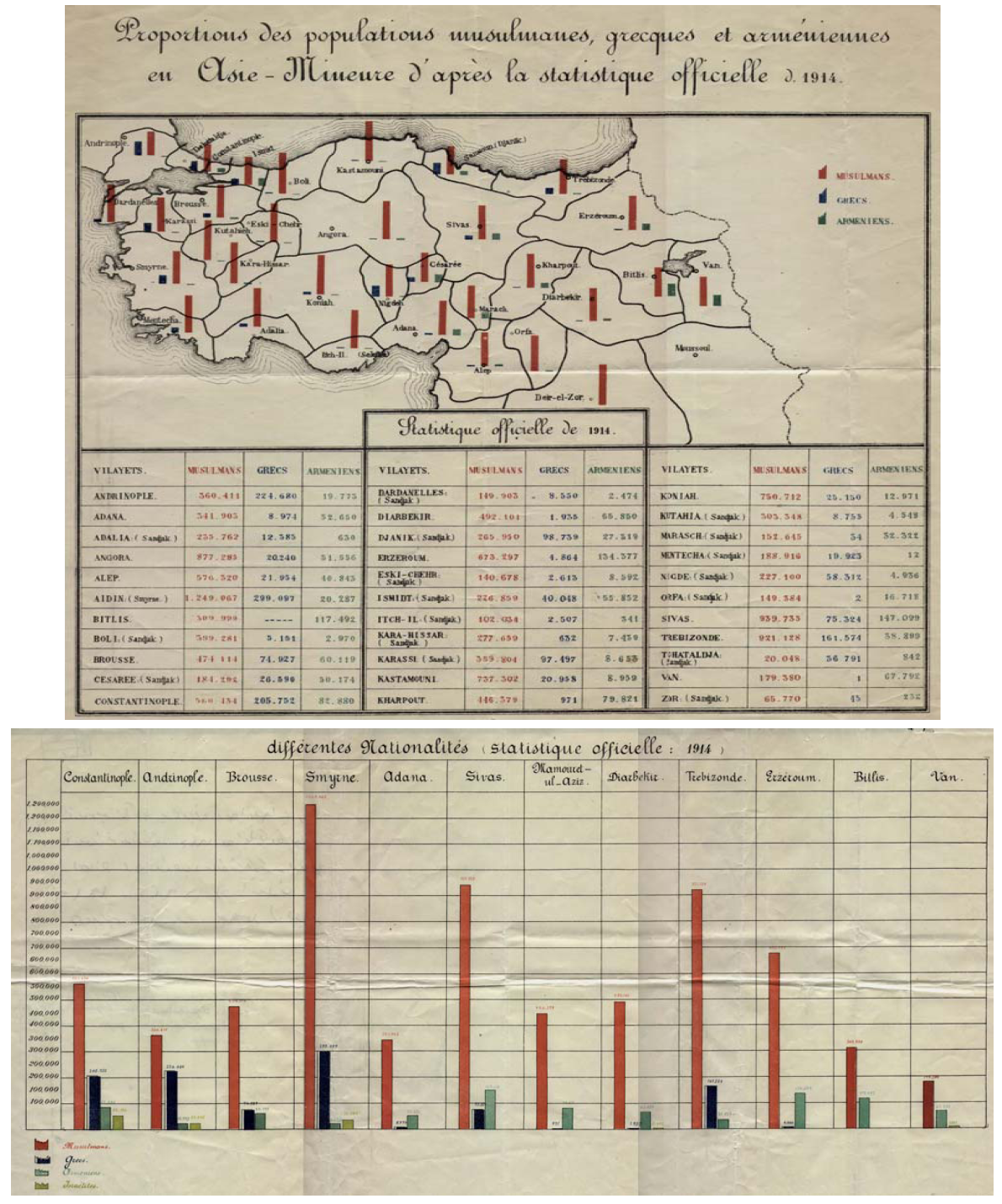
An official Ottoman document giving the results of the 1914 population census. The total population (sum of all millets) was 20,975,345, of which 1,792,206 were Greeks.

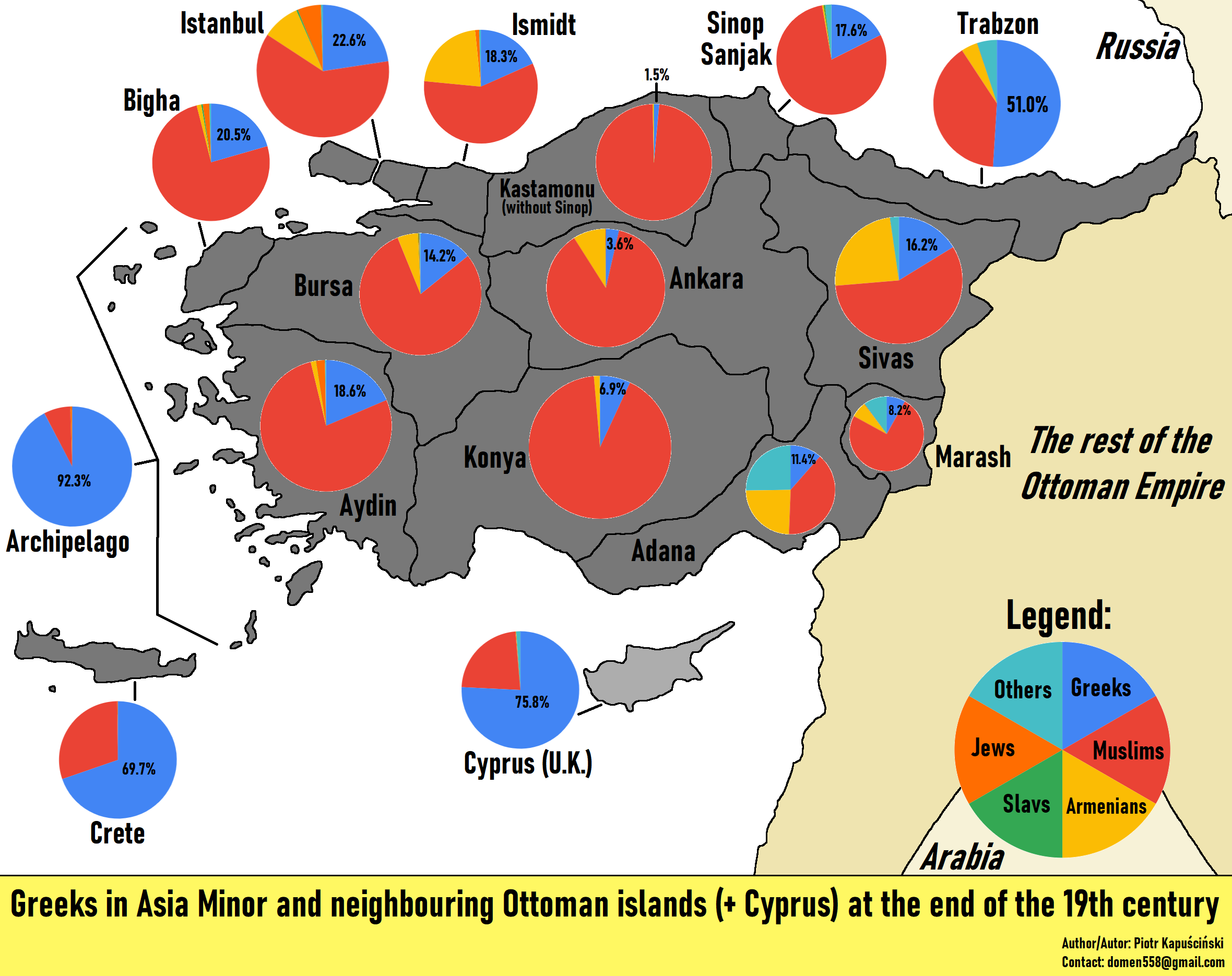
Distribution of ethnic Greek population in Anatolia at the end of the 19th century

== Modern ==
For the whole of the period between 1914 and 1922 and for the whole of Anatolia, there are academic estimates of death toll ranging from 289,000 to 750,000 Ottoman Greeks killed. The figure of 750,000 is suggested by political scientist Adam Jones. Scholar Rudolph Rummel compiled various figures from several studies to estimate lower and higher bounds for the death toll between 1914 and 1923. He estimates that 384,000 Greeks were exterminated from 1914 to 1918, and 264,000 from 1920 to 1922, with the total number reaching 648,000. Historian Constantine G. Hatzidimitriou writes that "loss of life among Anatolian Greeks during the WWI period and its aftermath was approximately 735,370".

== Smyrniote Greeks ==
Smyrniote Greeks (Greek: Σμυρνιώτες Έλληνες; Turkish: İzmir Yunanlıları) are a Greek ethnic community originating from Smyrna and its surrounding region on the western Anatolia.

== Pontic Greeks ==
Pontic Greeks (Greek: Πόντιοι, romanized: Póndii or Ελληνοπόντιοι, romanized: Ellinopóndii; Turkish: Pontus Rumları or Karadeniz Rumları, Georgian: პონტოელი ბერძნები, romanized: P’ont’oeli Berdznebi) are an ethnically Greek group who traditionally lived in the region of Pontus, on the shores of the Black Sea and in the Pontic Mountains of northeastern Anatolia.

== Cappadocian Greeks ==
Cappadocian Greeks also known as Greek Cappadocians (Greek: Έλληνες-Καππαδόκες, Ελληνοκαππαδόκες, Καππαδόκες; Turkish: Kapadokyalı Rumlar) or simply Cappadocians are an ethnic Greek community who traditionally lived to or originated from the geographical region of Cappadocia in central-eastern Anatolia up until the population exchange between Greece and Turkey.

== Notable Asia Minor Greeks ==
=== Ancient Greek ===
- Thales, pre-Socratic philosopher, considered the father of philosophy and science, one of the Seven Sages of Greece
- Homer, poet, the father of Western literature, his origin is disputed, but the most widespread account was that he was from Ionia
- Hesiod, poet, the father of Greek didactic poetry
- Herodotus, historian and geographer, the father of history
- Hecataeus of Miletus, historian and geographer, the father of geography
- Strabo, geographer and historian
- Hipparchus, astronomer, geographer, and mathematician, considered the father of astronomy and founder of trigonometry
- Apollonius of Perga, geometer and astronomer, one of the greatest mathematicians of antiquity
- Eudoxus of Cnidus, astronomer, mathematician, doctor, and lawmaker
- Hippodamus, architect, urban planner, physician, mathematician, meteorologist, the father of European urban planning
- Galen, physician and surgeon, one of the most accomplished of all medical researchers of antiquity
- Herophilos, physician, one of the earliest anatomists
- Dioscorides, physician, pharmacologist, botanist, the father of pharmacognosy
- Aretaeus of Cappadocia, physician, wrote eight treatises on diseases
- Soranus of Ephesus, physician, most notably his four-volume treatise on gynecology
- Apelles, renowned painter
- Bias of Priene, one of the Seven Sages of Greece
- Anaximander, pre-Socratic philosopher, first to attempt making a map of the known world
- Anaximenes, pre-Socratic philosopher
- Heraclitus, pre-Socratic philosopher
- Xenophanes, pre-Socratic philosopher, theologian and poet
- Anaxagoras, pre-Socratic philosopher and mathematician
- Leucippus, pre-Socratic philosopher, the founder of atomism
- Nausiphanes, atomist philosopher
- Diogenes, philosopher and one of the founders of Cynicism
- Eubulides, Megarian philosopher
- Diodorus Cronus, Megarian philosopher
- Xenocrates, Platonic philosopher and mathematician
- Crantor, Platonic philosopher
- Strato of Lampsacus, Peripatetic philosopher, called the Physicus
- Alexander of Aphrodisias, Peripatetic philosopher
- Cleanthes, Stoic philosopher and boxer
- Chrysippus, Stoic philosopher
- Epictetus, Stoic philosopher
- Antipater of Tarsus, Stoic philosopher
- Metrodorus of Lampsacus, Epicurean philosopher
- Diogenes of Oenoanda, Epicurean philosopher
- Arcesilaus, philosopher, the founder of Academic Skepticism
- Apollonius of Tyana, Neo-Pythagorean philosopher, became a mythical hero during the Roman Empire
- Proclus, Neoplatonic philosopher
- Simplicius of Cilicia, Neoplatonic philosopher
- Scylax of Caryanda, explorer and writer
- Anacreon, lyric poet
- Alcman, choral lyric poet
- Aratus, didactic poet
- Mimnermus, elegiac poet
- Callinus, elegiac poet
- Hipponax, iambic poet
- Diphilus, one of the greatest poets of New Comedy
- Quintus Smyrnaeus, epic poet
- Aspasia, the most important woman in the history of fifth-century Athens
- Chariton, novelist, wrote Callirhoe, arguably the earliest surviving Western novel
- Xenophon of Ephesus, novelist, wrote Ephesian Tale
- Heraclides Ponticus, philosopher and astronomer, possibly the originator of the heliocentric theory
- Philo of Byzantium, engineer, physicist and writer on mechanics
- Autolycus of Pitane, astronomer, mathematician, and geographer
- Callippus, astronomer and mathematician
- Crates of Mallus, constructed the earliest known globe of the Earth
- Theodosius of Bithynia, astronomer and mathematician
- Theon of Smyrna, mathematician and philosopher
- Bryson of Heraclea, mathematician
- Philetaerus, founder of the Attalid dynasty
- Sostratus of Cnidus, architect and engineer, probably designed the lighthouse of Alexandria
- Pythius of Priene, architect, designed the Temple of Athena Polias and the Mausoleum at Halicarnassus
- Asclepiades of Bithynia, physician
- Rufus of Ephesus, physician
- Nicander, physician and poet
- Oribasius, physician
- Alexander Polyhistor, scholar
- Serenus Sammonicus, savant and tutor, owned one of the largest private libraries of antiquity
- Cadmus of Miletus, the oldest of the logographers
- Xanthus, historian
- Ctesias, historian
- Ephorus, historian
- Mithridates of Pontus, from maternal side
- Euthydemus I, founder of Euthydemid dynasty
- Dionysius of Halicarnassus, historian and teacher of rhetoric
- Pausanias, geographer and historian
- Arrian, historian and philosopher
- Agatharchides, historian
- Cassius Dio, historian
- Dio Chrysostom, historian and orator
- Diogenes Laertius, biographer of the Greek philosophers
- Eunapius, historian
- Philostorgius, historian
- Aelius Aristides, orator and author
- Themistius, statesman, rhetorician and philosopher
- Thrasymachus, sophist
- Alcidamas, sophist and rhetorician
- Polemon of Laodicea, sophist
- Zenodotus, grammarian, the first librarian of the Library of Alexandria

=== Byzantine ===
- Cappadocian Fathers
  - Basil of Caesarea, Bishop and theologian
  - Gregory of Nazianzus, archbishop of Constantinople and theologian
  - Gregory of Nyssa
- Isidore of Miletus and Anthemius of Tralles, two main Byzantine architects and mathematicians, designed the Hagia Sophia
- Alexander of Tralles, one of the most eminent physicians in the Byzantine Empire
- George of Pisidia, Byzantine poet
- Nicephorus Gregoras, Byzantine mathematician and astronomer
- Michael Psellos, Byzantine savant, historian and music theorist
- Michael Attaleiates, Byzantine chronicler
- Niketas Choniates, Byzantine historian
- Maximus Planudes, Byzantine grammarian and theologian
- Artemidorus, diviner and dream interpreter
- Ulfilas, creator of the Gothic alphabet
- Saint Nicholas, early Christian bishop, the prototype for Santa Claus
- Saint George, Roman soldier and early Christian martyr
- Helena, Augusta of the Roman Empire and mother of Emperor Constantine the Great
- Basilina, mother of Emperor Julian the Apostate
- Maurice, Byzantine emperor
- Heraclius, Byzantine emperor
- Michael II the Amorian, Byzantine emperor
- Akritai
  - Digenes Akritas
- Maleinos
- Melissenos family
- Botaneiates
- Dalassenos
- Phokas family
  - Nikephoros II Phokas, Byzantine emperor
- John Tzimiskes, Byzantine emperor
- Argyros (Byzantine family)
  - Romanos III Argyros, Byzantine emperor
- Michael IV the Paphlagonian, Byzantine emperor
- Doukas
  - Constantine X Doukas, Byzantine emperor
- Romanos IV Diogenes, Byzantine emperor
- Alexios I Komnenos, Byzantine emperor
- Alexios I of Trebizond, Komnenian ruler of the Empire of Trebizon
- Angelos
- House of Laskaris
  - Theodore I Laskaris, first emperor of Nicaea
- Palaiologos
  - Michael VIII Palaiologos, Byzantine emperor
- Kantakouzenos
- Alexios Philanthropenos, Byzantine general

=== Modern ===
- Sinan, chief Ottoman architect, engineer and mathematician
- Ypsilantis family
- Arsenios the Cappadocian
- Saint Paisios of Mount Athos (1924–1994) born Arsenios Eznepidis, a well-known Athonite monk from Pharasa, Cappadocia.
- Leonidas Kestekides
- Aristotle Onassis
- Markos Vafiadis
- Napoleon Soukatzidis
- Giorgos Seferis
- Elia Kazan

== See also ==
- List of Thracian Greeks
- Macedonia (Greece)
- Western Thrace
- Kaisariani
- Nea Ionia
- Nea Smyrni
- Nea Filadelfeia

== Sources ==
- Jones, Adam (2010) [2006], Genocide: A Comprehensive Introduction, Taylor & Francis, ISBN 978-0-415-48618-7
