= Priene Synagogue =

Ancient synagogue in Priene, Turkey

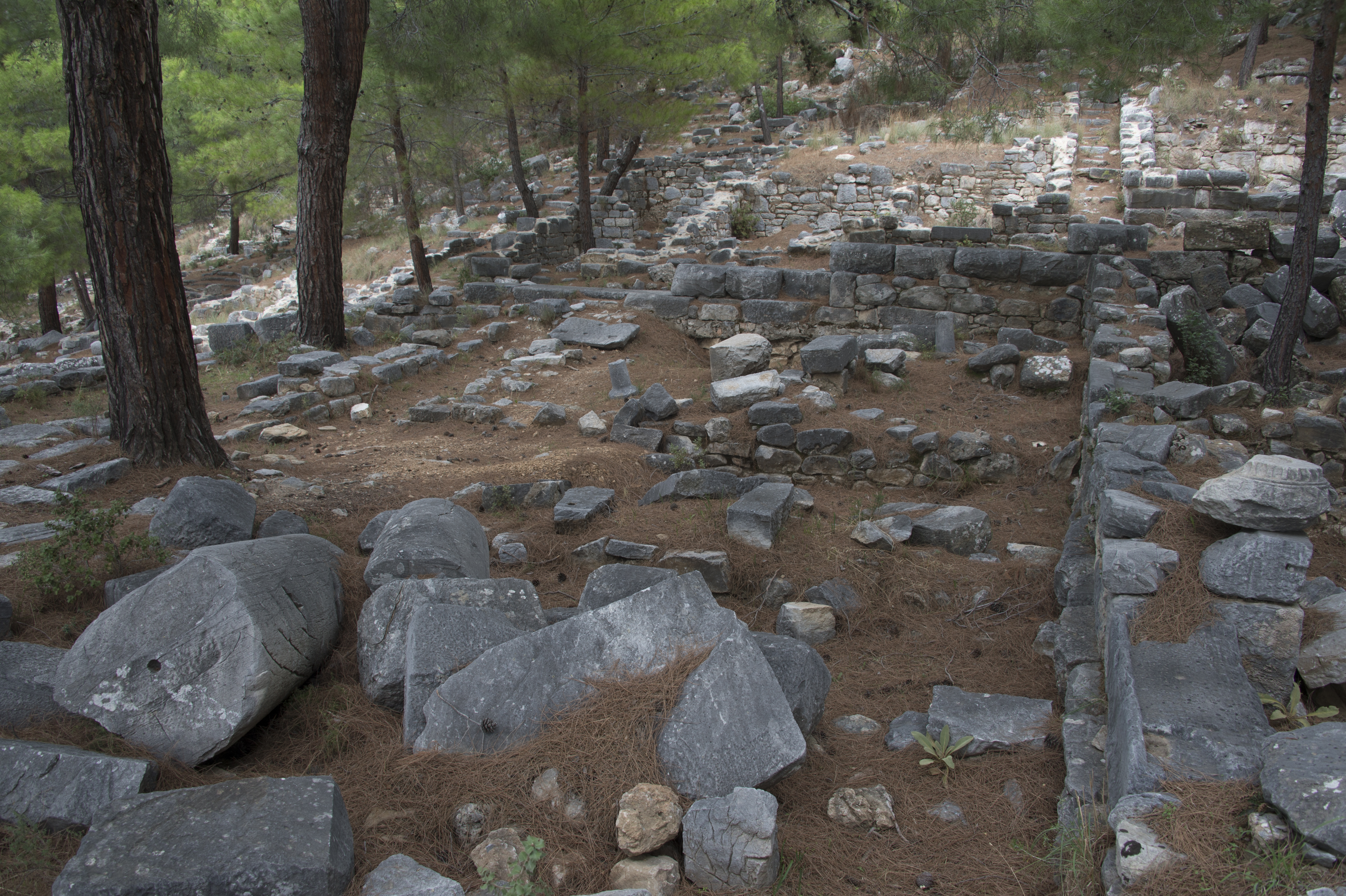
- The former synagogue ruins, in 2015

- Location of the former synagogue ruins in modern-day Aegean Region of Turkey

Religion
- Affiliation: Judaism (former)
- Ecclesiastical or organisational status: Synagogue (ruins); Jewish museum
- Status: Archaeological site

Location
- Location: Priene, Güllübahçe, Söke, Aydın Province, Aegean Region
- Country: Turkey
- Coordinates: 37°39′30.8″N 27°17′44.4″E

Architecture
- Type: Synagogue architecture
- Style: Roman architecture,Greek architecture
- Completed: 2nd century CE (Note: With one source claiming 4th or 5th century.)
- Materials: Stone

The Priene Synagogue is a former ancient Jewish synagogue, that was discovered in the ancient city Priene in Güllübahçe, Söke, in the Aydın Province, in the Aegean Region, near the western coast of Turkey. The former synagogue building is now an archaeological site open to the public.

== History ==
The synagogue was discovered by archaeologists Theodor Wiegand and Hans Schrader in the western residential area in 1895–98. The synagogue dates from the 2nd century CE and was built into an older Hellenistic house. It consists of a main hall with two rows of columns forming a small basilica. Only one column was still in place. However, in the 1904 excavation report they mistakenly speculated that the structure was a house church.

In 1928, archaeologist Eleazar Sukenik identified the building as a synagogue, pointing to a niche for the Torah Ark. He also noted the carved menorah near the niche. It is known that hundreds of thousands of Jews lived in Asia Minor in the 1st century CE. Only two confirmed synagogues have been discovered: the Sardis Synagogue and this second one in Priene.

In the summer of 2009 archaeologists Nadin Burkhardt from the University of Frankfurt am Main and Mark Wilson of the Asia Minor Research Center in İzmir began an exploration of the synagogue in a dig sponsored by the Biblical Archaeology Society.

== See also ==
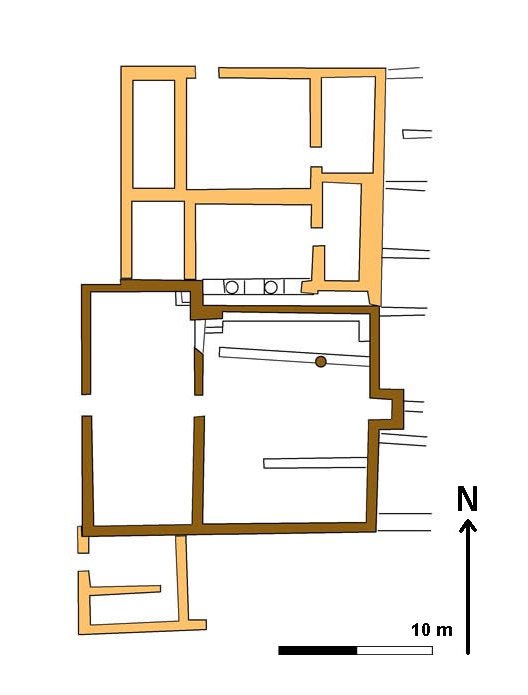
A 1904 redraw of the former synagogue floor plan

- History of the Jews in Turkey
- List of synagogues in Turkey
