= Temple of Athena Polias (Priene) =

Archaeological site

Temple of Athena Polias at Priene
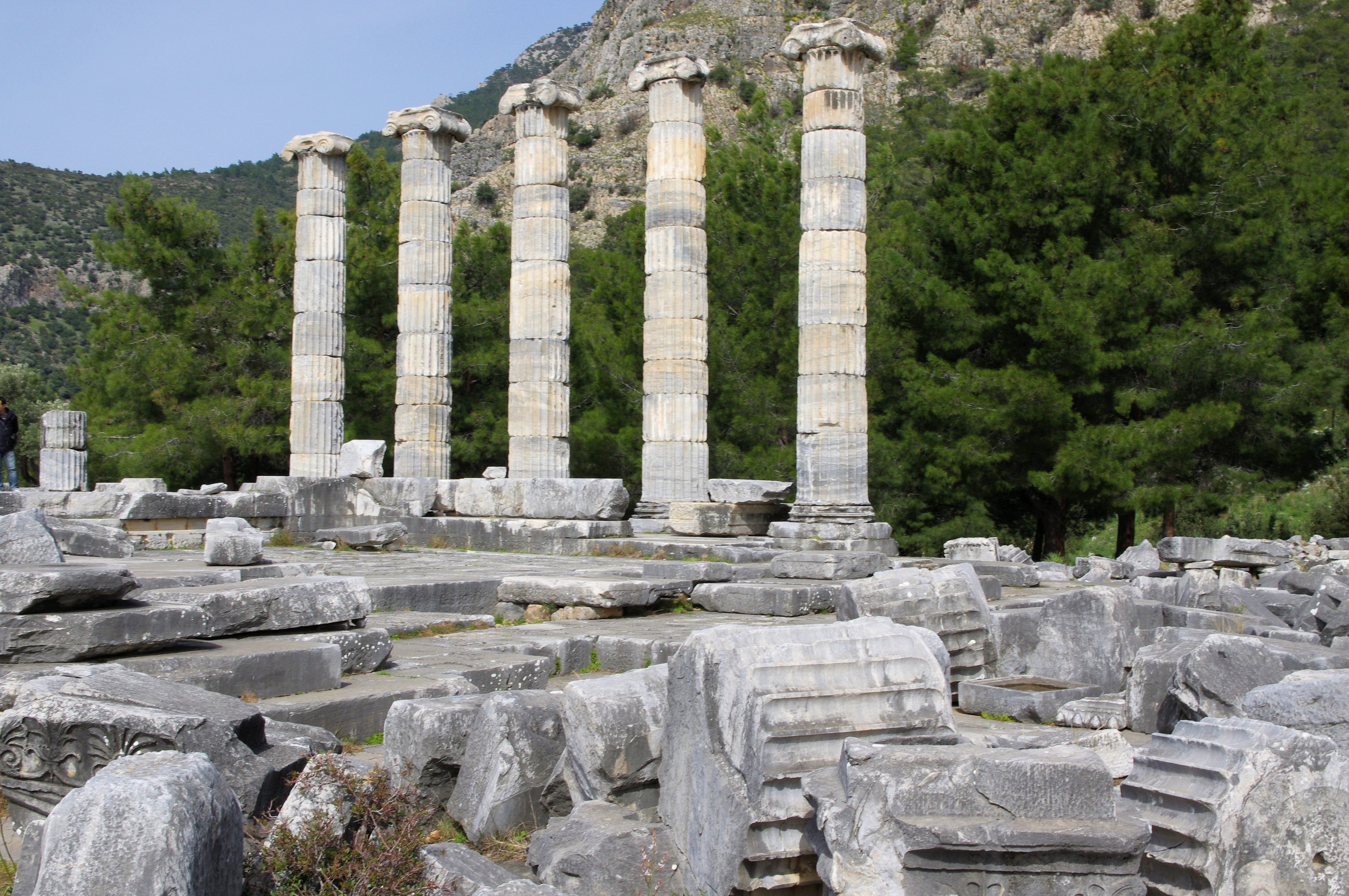
- The Temple of Athena, funded by Alexander the Great, at the foot of an escarpment of Mycale. The five columns were erected in 1965–66 from rubble.

- Location within Turkey
- 37°39′34″N 27°17′48″E
- Type: Temple
- Location: Güllübahçe, Söke, Aydın Province, Turkey
- Region: Ionia

History
- Built: ca. 350-330 BC
- Built by: Pythius

Site notes
- Area: 727.26 m^{2} (7,828.2 sq ft)

The Temple of Athena Polias in Priene was an Ionic Order temple located northwest of Priene’s agora, inside the sanctuary complex. It was dedicated to Athena Polias, also the patron deity of Athens. It was the main temple in Priene, although there was a temple of Zeus. Built around 350 BC, its construction was sponsored by Alexander the Great during his anabasis to the Persian Empire. Its ruins sit at the foot of an escarpment of mount Mycale. It was believed to have been constructed and designed by Pytheos, who was the architect of the great Mausoleum of Halikarnassos, one of the Seven Wonders of the Ancient World. It was one of the Hellenistic temples that was not reconstructed by Romans.

== Discovery ==
The first record of modern discovery is Jacob Spon and George Wheler visiting in the 17th century. The next recorded of this site was in 1764-65 when Richard Chandler had his Asia Minor expedition funded by the Society of Dilettanti. The temple was surveyed and drawn a second time in the Society's 1811-12 expedition, and in their third of 1868-69, Richard Pullan excavated and surveyed the temple and the city in a more comprehensive manner. He also brought some of the finds to the British Museum. This saved some stones of the temple from later lundering by local villagers in 1870. Since then, excavation has been done by German archaeologists, most significantly the 1895-99 studies by Theodor Wiegand and Hans Schrader. As a result, some excavation material is stored in the Pergamon Museum in Berlin.

== Construction ==
The building of the temple started merely simultaneously with the constriction of the new Priene city. It was estimated the building date is 350-330 BC. After Alexander the Great gained his victory at Granicus River in 334 BC, he dedicated the Temple to Athena Polias by funding the cost of construction. Although it was not recorded in Arrian’s The Anabasis of Alexander, there is a dedication inscription records the funding gifts and a Rhodes award favouring Priene. The inscription is on a marble flank wall block of the temple. This indicates that the antae were built before this dedication.

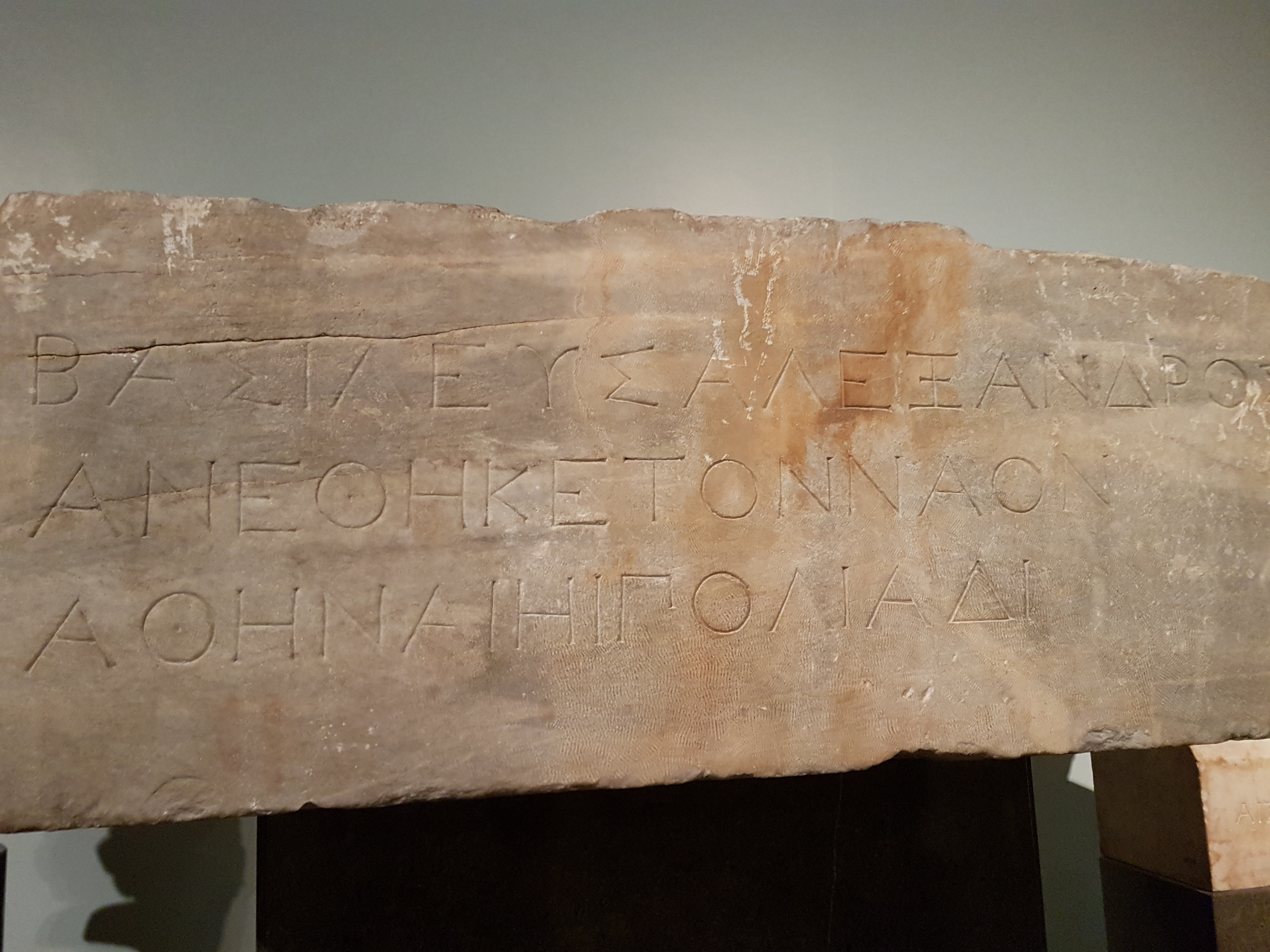
The Alexander's inscription. It is "King Alexander dedicated the temple to Athena Polias." British Museum.

This dedication originally was not for this temple. The Alexander firstly found the temple of Artemis in Ephesos for dedication. However, he was refused. Thereafter, he, travelling alongside the coast, found Priene and gave his dedication. Priene accepted.

From the architecture decoration style, the capitals of pillars were constructed in the 4th century BC. The eastern section including the pediment was completed in the same period. This was the first phase of construction. In contrast, the western parts were remaining incomplete for at least two centuries. These were the later phases.

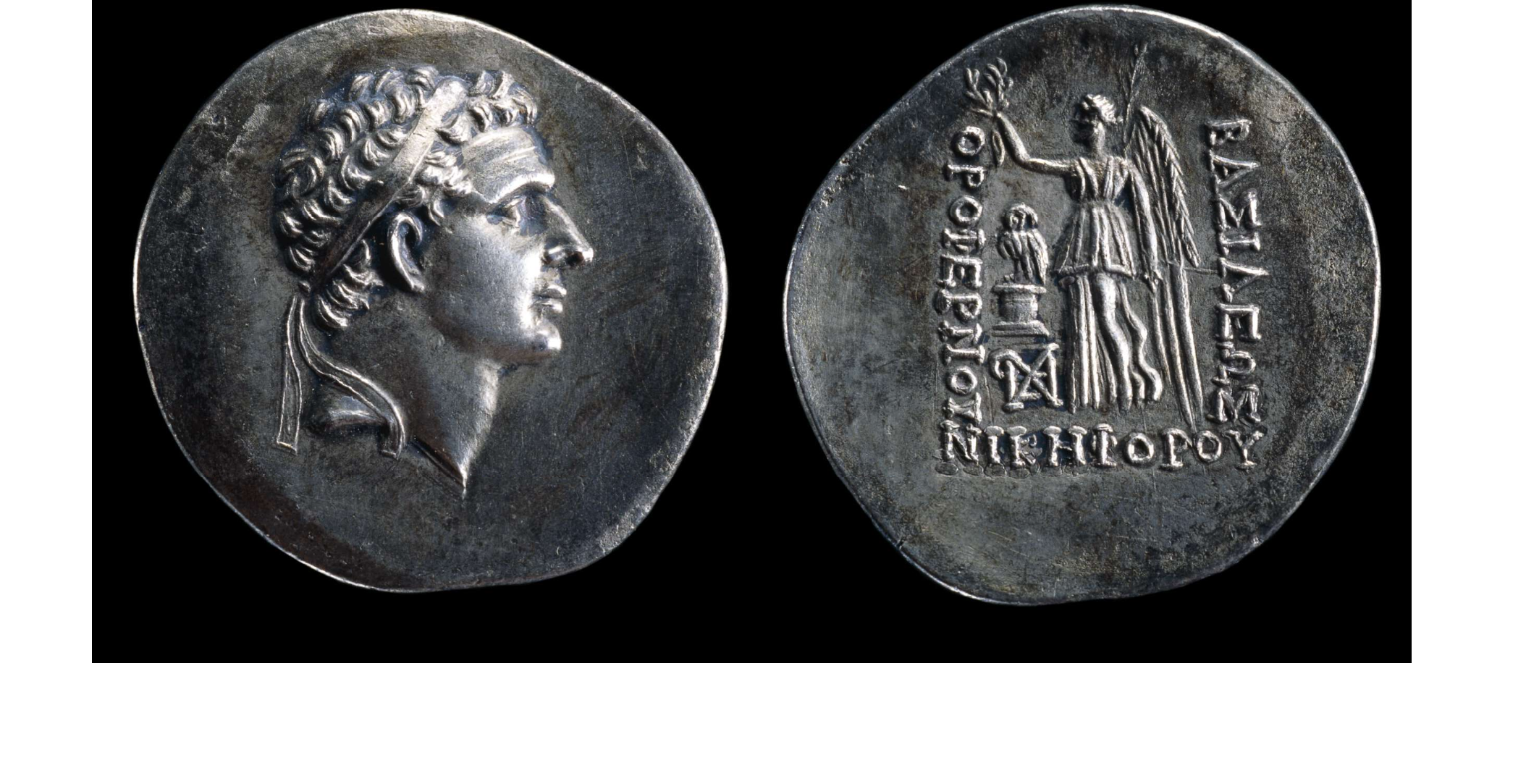
Orophernes' coin's two sides which found under the statue base. The inscription is "Of King Orophernes Nikephoros [Victorious.]"

A feature of the first construction phase was the moulding shape and size was similar to other great temples. The Ionic order moulding was more complicated, and the column capitals were more decorated. Results of this phase usually similar to the Mausoleum of Halikarnassos. The columns constructed in later phases were simpler.

Only the upper sections dated after mid-2nd century BC survive and these were estimated to consist two-thirds of the ceiling and roof. King Oropherenes of Cappadocia (reigned c. 158-156 BC) sponsored the temple construction, so did other Prienian buildings. This indicates that the temple construction spent at least 2 centuries. The construction time across the whole Hellenistic period and reached the Roman Republic time. The temple construction, itself, was a continuing process of the Prienian people and major part of Priene's history. It is because Priene's residents moved to Miletus in 2nd century BC. This was due to Priene’s river, Maeander, becoming a lake, as muds blocked the entrance, causing gnats to breed in vast swarms. Thus, soon after the temple was completed, or even before it was fully completed, the temple was abandoned until the imperial period.

During Augustus's reign, the Roman Empire financially supported the completion of the temple. Therefore, a deified Augustus’s name was carved into the east architrave. The temple was finally fully completed before he died.

== After the construction ==
The temple became a ruin in the 7th century due to earthquakes. After that, only minor pillaging happened. The lowest stratum in the cella was untouched. It was because the metals of the cella doorway remained during the third excavation in 1868 and locals or invaders usually loot precious bronze if they discovered it. The temple’s materials were mostly stationed at the original site. Therefore, it becomes one of the rare undisturbed sites to understand Hellenistic temples. The peaceful abandoning of Priene may also contribute to the temple’s completeness nowadays. There are five columns that were reconstructed in 1965. The rest of the site is full of scattered stones and ruins.

== Architecture ==
The architecture style is an Ionic order temple, doubtlessly. However, While the Britannia Encyclopaedia claimed it is a typical pure Ionic style, Gruben suggested that older elements were combined. Gruben stated his claim from the harmonious dimension ratio which was the exact integral multiples of the attic feet (29.46 cm (11.60 in)). He believed that this was a feature from academicism of late Classical era.

=== Similarity to the Mausoleum at Halikarnassos ===
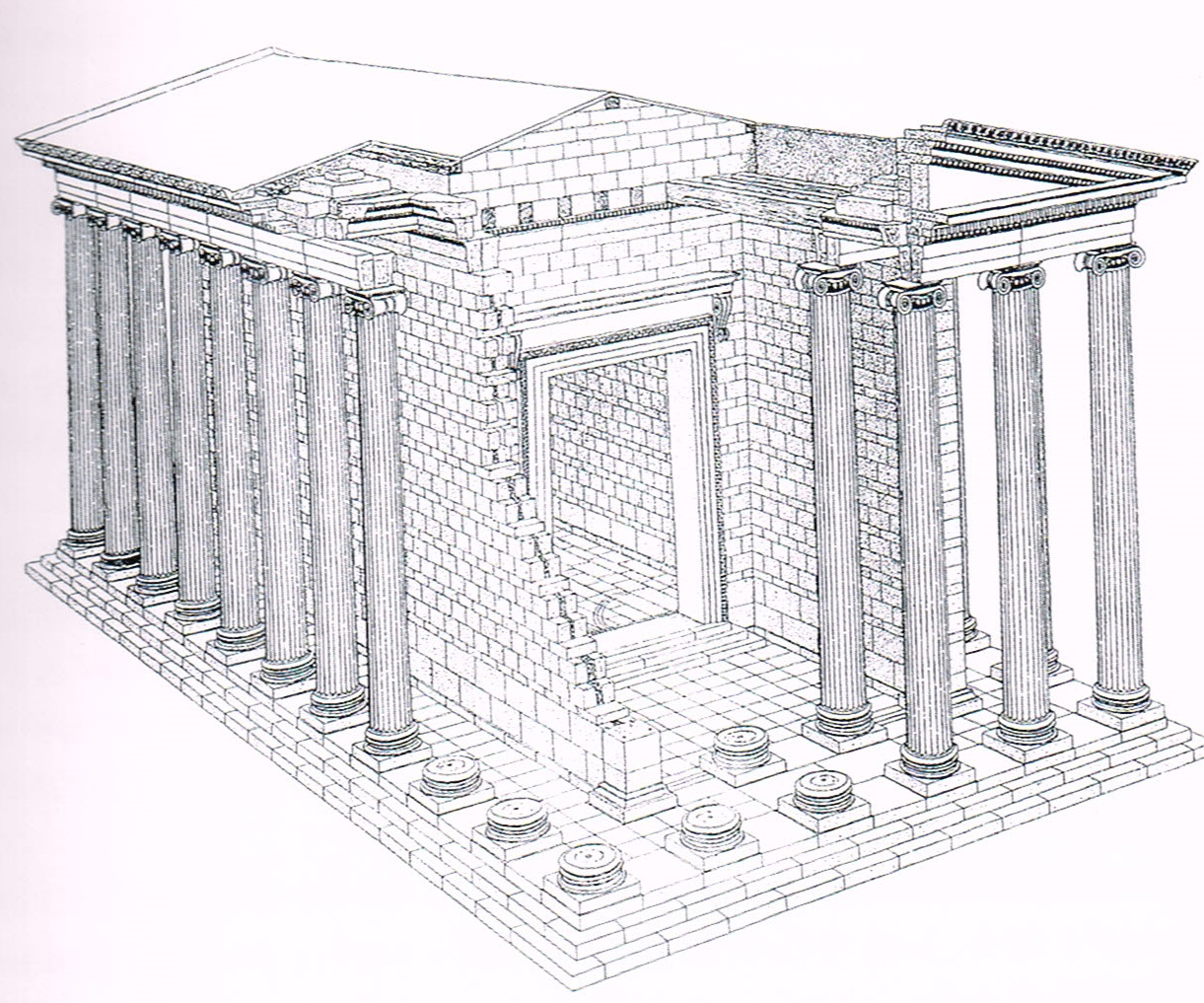
Cut-away view of the temple

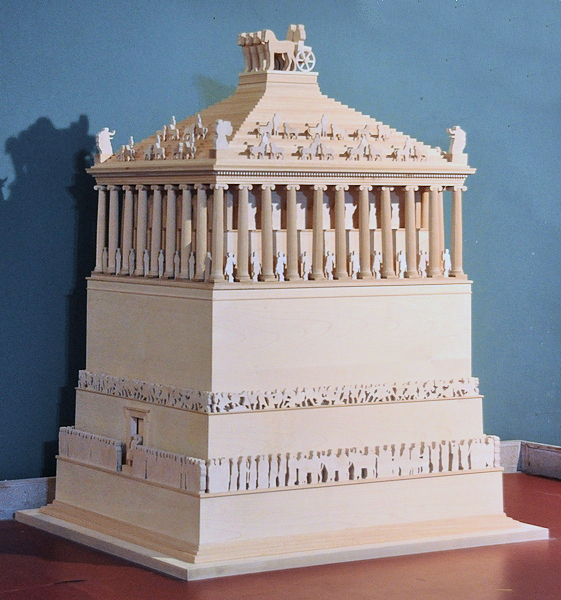
Model of the Mausoleum

Pytheos was the architect of both the temple and Mausoleum at Halicarnassus, which is one of the Seven Wonders of the Ancient World. They both were in an Asiatic style, architrave supported no frieze, rather than Attic style, which would become the major style in the Ionic order. Their columns both reached 11.5 m (38 ft). Given their overlapping construction time, many people who worked on the tomb probably also worked on the temple.

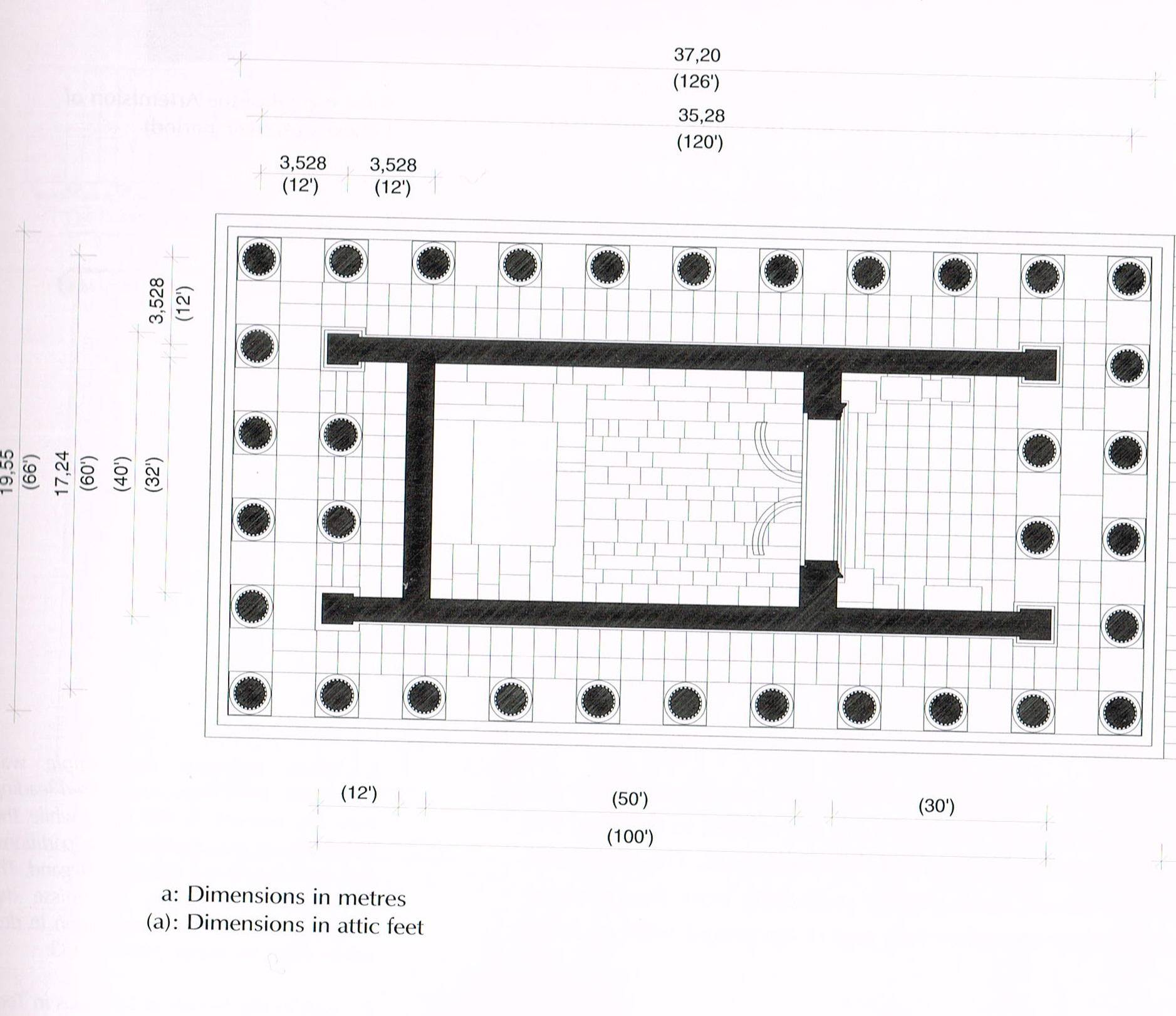
Layout of the temple

=== Layout ===
The temple was an east-west placement. The entrance was at the east. It was a rectangle layout with 11 columns in length and 6 columns in width on the boundary. The parallel temple walls were 100 attic feet long and 32 attic feet between them. The temple cella was enclosed by a western wall, created an "opisthodomos" at the west, and eastern door, which separates the cella and the near square "Pronaos". Both "pronaos" and "opisthodomos" had two columns in the façade, which was an Asiatic style.

=== Statue ===
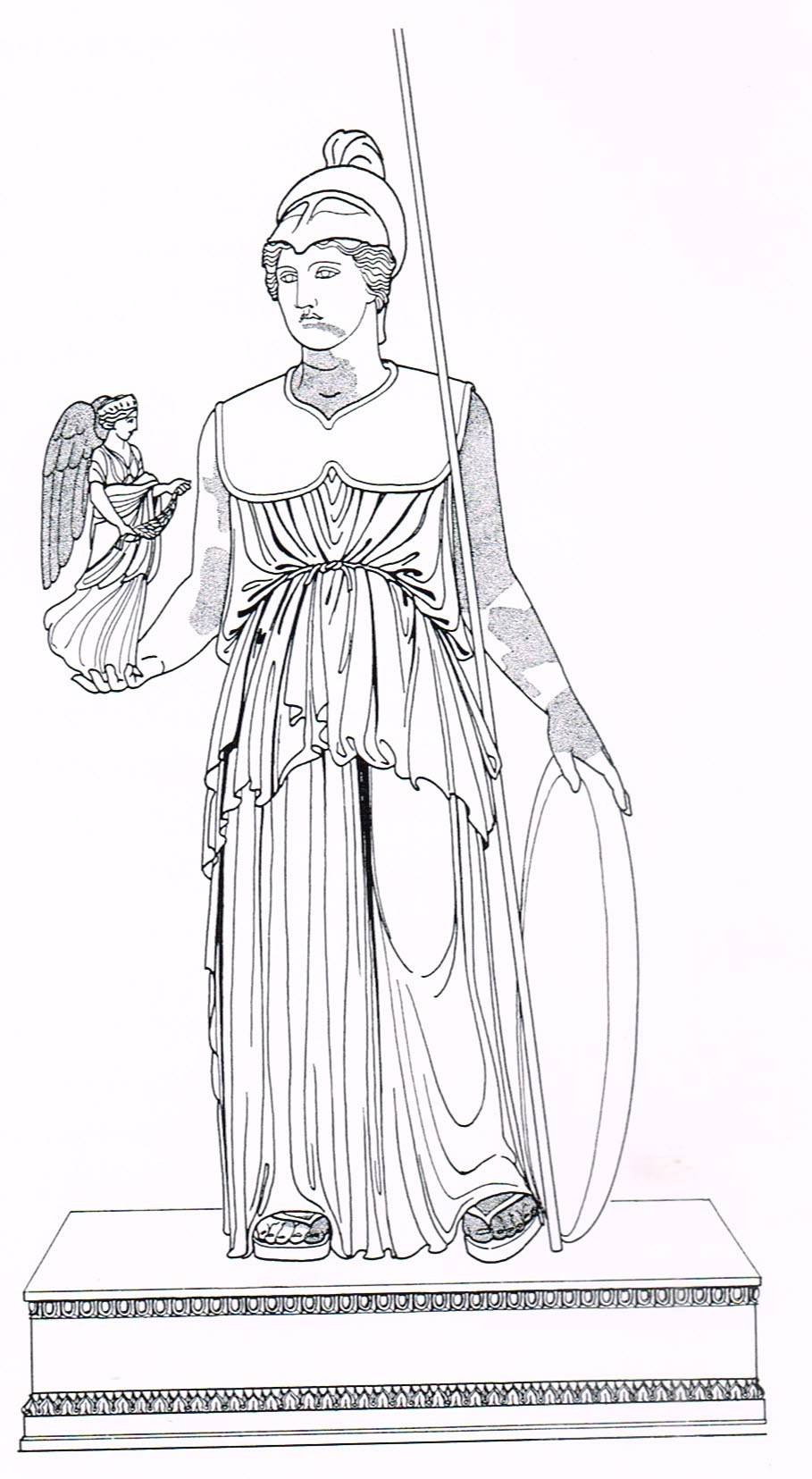
Reconstruction of the colossal cult Athena Polias statue drawn by S. Bird

Inside the cella, there was an Athena Polias statue for dedication. However, the actual shape was unknown. In ca. 158-156 BC, a sculpture, offering of Orophernes, replaced the old statue. Tetradrachms at that time indicated this event. The new statue remained of Athena but was a copy of the gold and ivory version by Phidias in Athens. It was a standing statue of Athena, with calm facial expression and holding a spear and a shield, wearing a helmet. The statue was 6.5 m (21 ft) tall and three times smaller than the Athenian original.

The new statue was made by an acrolithic mix, which only surfaces were marble, and internals were woods. She held a small divine, might be goddess Nike (Victory), on her right hand. An excavation of gilded bronze wings indicates this. The statue was broken into many fragments with ten larger parts now.

The statue’s base was a hollow scare podium with marble on the surfaces. The base also was from mid-2nd century BC.

=== Colour ===
The colours first discovered are cinnabar red and cooper blue-green. They were for the sculptural decoration background. The blue colour was also the background of panels and the abacus of column capitals. Red was used for Ionic eggs and Lesbian moulding. Later, their colour was switched and alternated. Therefore, it was possible to see red and blue alternative colour on the same background or location.

=== Coffering ===
There were 26 coffers on the temple. The coffers had decorations with square openings in centres. The 65 cm square coffer "lid" utilized the technique of step overlaps and interlock, which also appeared at the Mausoleum. But the version in the temple was a simplified and surer one. This architecture style brings paradox for the archaeologist. It is because this coffering style was a c. 350-325 BC Pytheos design. But the superstructure of the temple started to build mainly in the mid-2nd century BC. The two facts were contradicting. The actual construction time of the coffering remains unsolved.

The coffer decorations illustrated the battles between gods and giants. The gods were not only in Greek mythology. An Anatolian mother goddess, Cybele was craved on a coffer and rode a lion. The illustration of giants cannot indicate specific giants and was mostly in male naked kind. Amazons were also illustrated as the allies of giants.

These coffers were painted, although colours are lost. However, the figures and other moulding were not painted and remained the marble white colour. These designs were for the against blue painted backgrounds. The bead and reel were also not painted, to against red background.

=== Walls ===
The temple emphasised the mathematical proportions and purity in architecture style. Therefore, there was no sculpted decoration on the walls. The only exception was the text archives on the southern wall.

=== Columns ===
The columns were typical Ionic order. The sides capitals were tendrils facing each other. The front façade of columns capitals were mouldings and palmettes in successive series.

== See also ==
- List of Ancient Greek temples
- Alexander the Great's edict to Priene, inscribed on the temple
