= Priene inscription of Alexander the Great =

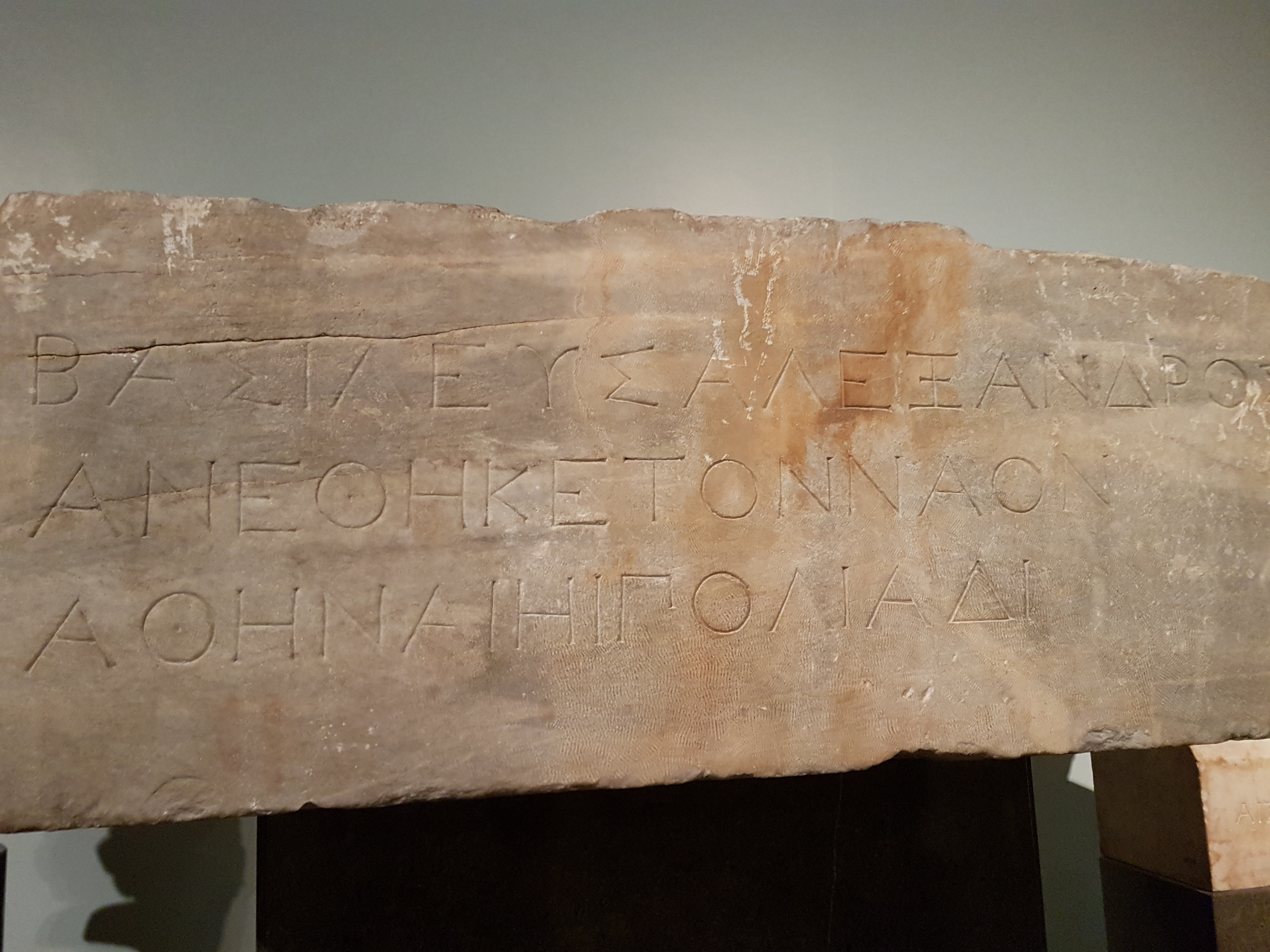
- Part of the Priene Inscription on display in the British Museum
- Material: Marble
- Size: 120 cm wide and 49.5 cm high
- Writing: Ancient Greek
- Created: c.330 BC
- Discovered: 1868-9; Priene
- Discovered by: Richard Popplewell Pullan
- Present location: British Museum, London
- Identification: 1870,0320.88
- Registration: 1870,0320.88

The Priene inscription is a dedicatory inscription by Alexander the Great, which was discovered at the Temple of Athena Polias in Priene (modern Turkey), in the nineteenth century. It now forms an important part of the British Museum's Ancient Greek epigraphic collection and provides a direct link to one of the most famous persons in ancient history. This inscription (circa 330 BC) is about the dedication of a temple by Alexander to Athena Polias, which has been held at the British Museum in London.

== Discovery ==
The inscription was found in the precincts of the temple in 1868–9 by the architect Richard Pullan, who at the time was leading an archaeological exploration of Priene on behalf of the Society of Dilettanti. The dedicatory inscription was found at the end of one of the temple's walls, together with records of the Prienean Civic Codes. Pullan brought back inscriptions, sculptures and architectural remains from the site to England, where they were immediately deposited in the national collection.

== Background ==
Alexander the Great's army crossed the Hellespont in 334 BC and defeated the Persian army at the Battle of the Granicus; he then proceeded along the Ionian coast, touring cities and expelling Persian garrisons as he did so. At Priene he generously supported the completion of the temple of Athena Polias, which is recorded for posterity on this large marble block.

== Description ==
The marble wall block is inscribed on both sides in the ancient Greek language. Part of the inscription records the gift of funds provided by Alexander to build the temple. Another part refers to a resolution of land disputes between different neighbouring kingdoms following the expulsion of the Persians.

== Translation of the Inscription ==
Inscription:

ΒΑΣΙΛΕΥΣ ΑΛΕΞΑΝΔΡΟΣ ΑΝΕΘΗΚΕ ΤΟΝ ΝΑΟΝ ΑΘΗΝΑΙΗΙ ΠΟΛΙΑΔΙ

Basileus Alexandros anethēke ton naon Athēnaiēi Poliadi

Translation:

King Alexander dedicated the Temple to Athena Polias
