= Arcesius (architect) =

Arcesius or (T)arcesius was an Ionian architect who worked in Ionia during the 3rd century BCE. He is mentioned in a passage of Vitruvius and it is considered that the T of his name was assimilated in the relevant manuscript from the previous word negavit. He allegedly worked in Tralles and was assigned the Temple of Asclepius there. Vitruvius (vi. 3. 1) mentions him in association with the Ionian architects Pythios and Hermogenes for writing treatises criticizing the Doric order for being "faulty" and "inharmonious." He is probably the same as Argelius, a name similar in the relative list given by Vitruvius of Ionian architects who wrote treatises on various architectural topics (Vitruvius, vii praef. 12).
