= Pythius of Priene =

Greek architect of the 4th century BCE

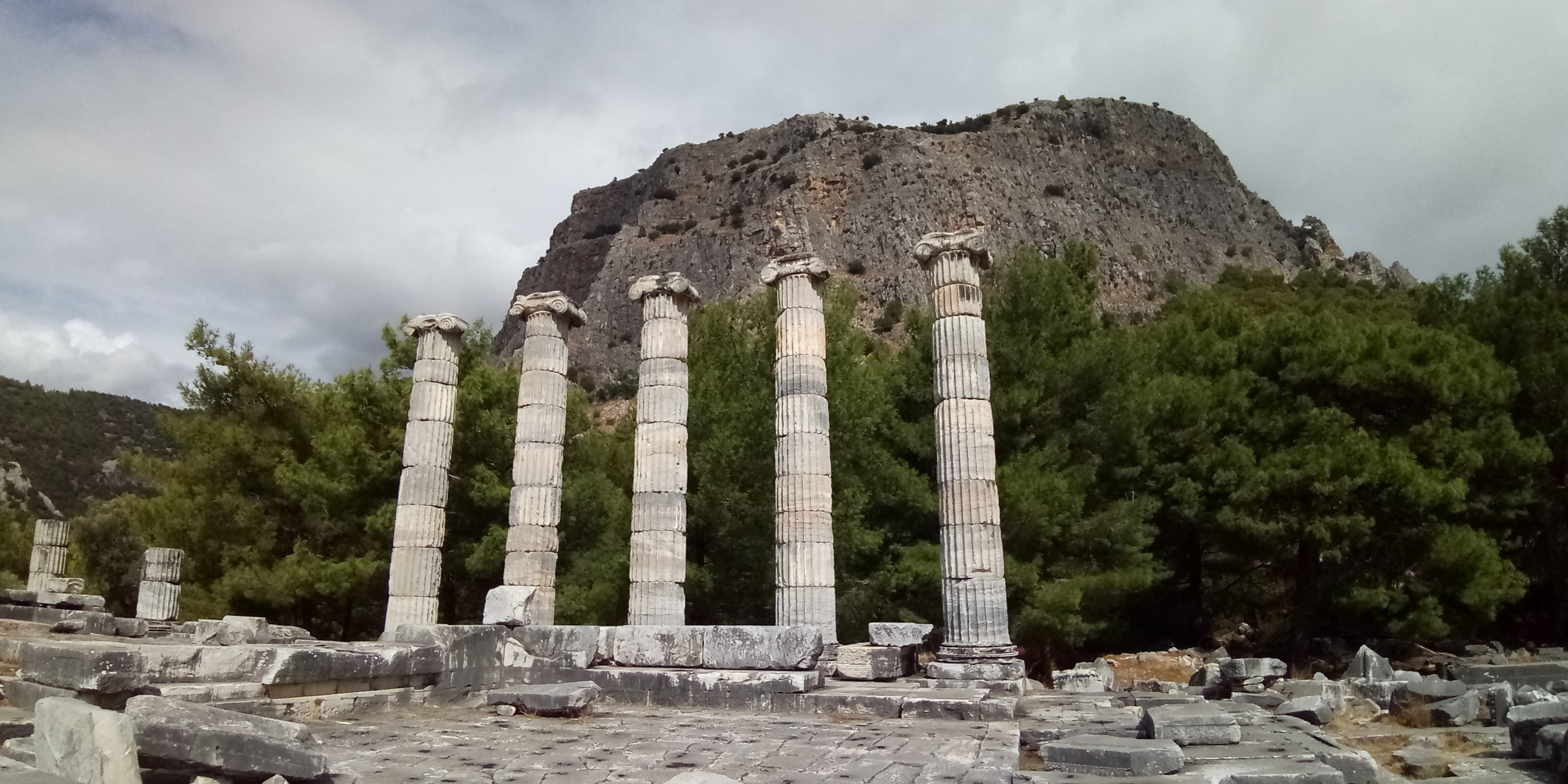
The Temple of Athena Polias at Priene

Pythius (Greek: Πύθιος), also known as Pytheos (Greek: Πυθεός) or Pythis, was a Greek architect, architecture theorist, and sculptor of the 4th century BC. He designed the Temple of Athena Polias at Priene and the Mausoleum at Halicarnassus, which was regarded in antiquity among the Seven Wonders of the World. It is presumed that he came from the Greek city of Priene. The first-century BC Roman architect Vitruvius called Pythius a "celebrated builder" (de Architectura I.1.12) and referenced lost treatises on architecture written in Greek by Pythius as sources for his Latin architecture manual de Architectura (I.1.15).

== Architectural theory ==
=== The discipline of architecture ===
Pythius' Commentaries are lost, but Vitruvius paraphrases his philosophy of architectural education, in which the architect should aim to be a polymath knowledgeable "in all the arts and sciences (De architectura I.1.12)." Pythius was a pioneer because he "propounded the importance of architecture as a learned discipline and sought to establish standards for it."

=== Criticism of the Doric order ===
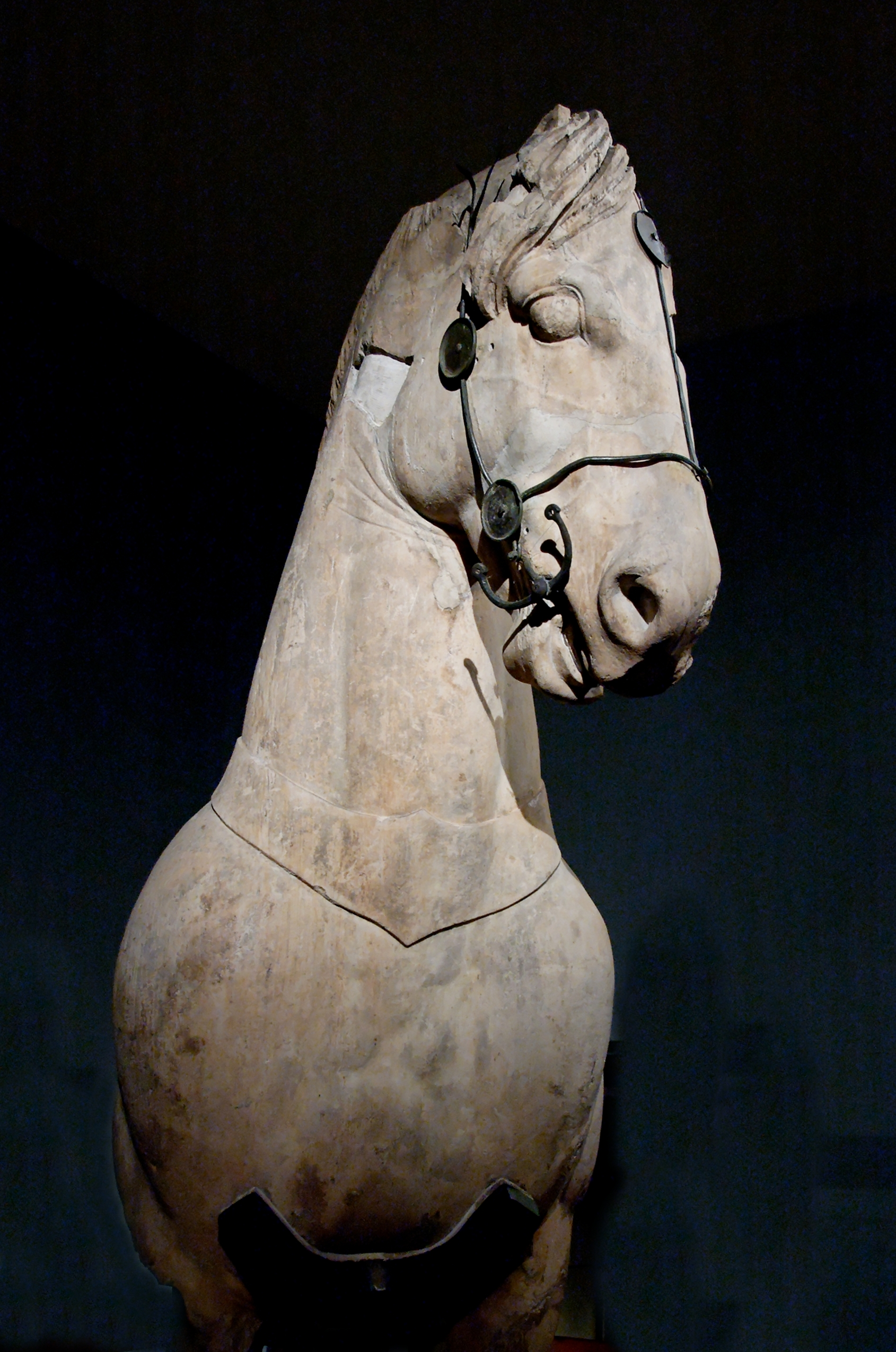
A colossal marble horse from the quadriga on top of the Mausoleum at Halicarnassus, a sculpture group made by Pythius. British Museum.

Pythius together with Arcesius and Hermogenes disparaged the Doric order, according to Vitruvius (IV.3.1), for the "faults and incongruities" caused by the frieze of triglyphs, which required altering the regular spacing of columns at the corners ("the Doric corner conflict"). Pythius, who worked in Ionia, appears to have used the Ionic order exclusively.

=== Grid planning ===
The plan for the Temple of Athena Polias at Priene is based on a regular grid with uniformly spaced columns and marks an important development of the grid plan in Greek architecture. J.J. Pollitt called Pythius' grid-based design "'order' in an extreme degree" and a display of "a kind of icy, intellectual elegance." The grid designs of Pythius were a major influence on the Hellenistic architect Hermogenes.

== Works ==
=== The Mausoleum at Halicarnassus ===
Pythius and Satyros were the co-designers of the Mausoleum at Halicarnassus (modern-day Bodrum, Turkey), the tomb for the Carian king Mausolus. The Mausoleum was covered in statues and reliefs by four important 4th-century Greek sculptors: Leochares, Bryaxis, Scopas of Paros, and Timotheus. Pythius, however, is credited with sculpting the great marble quadriga on top of the structure, fragments of which survive and are today displayed in the British Museum.

=== Temple of Athena Polias at Priene ===
An inscription on an anta of the Temple of Athena Polias at Priene, which today is in the British Museum, records Alexander the Great as the temple's dedicator ca. 330 BC. The temple was not completed until much later.

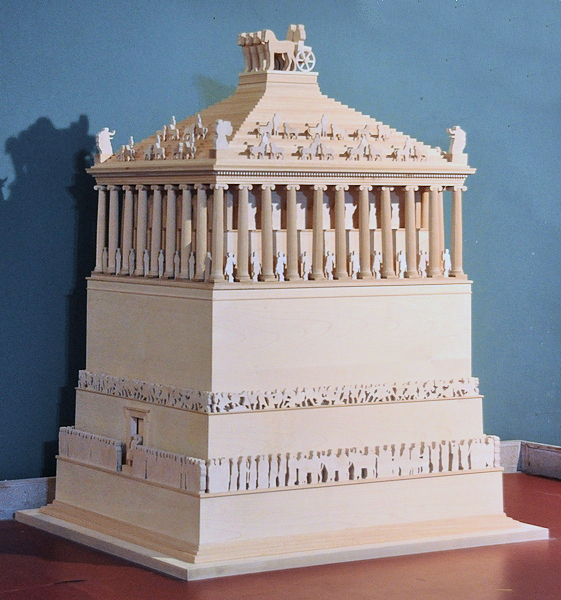
Model of the Mausoleum at Halicarnassus, Bodrum Museum of Underwater Archaeology
