= Bias of Priene =

6th-century BC Greek sage

- Βίας
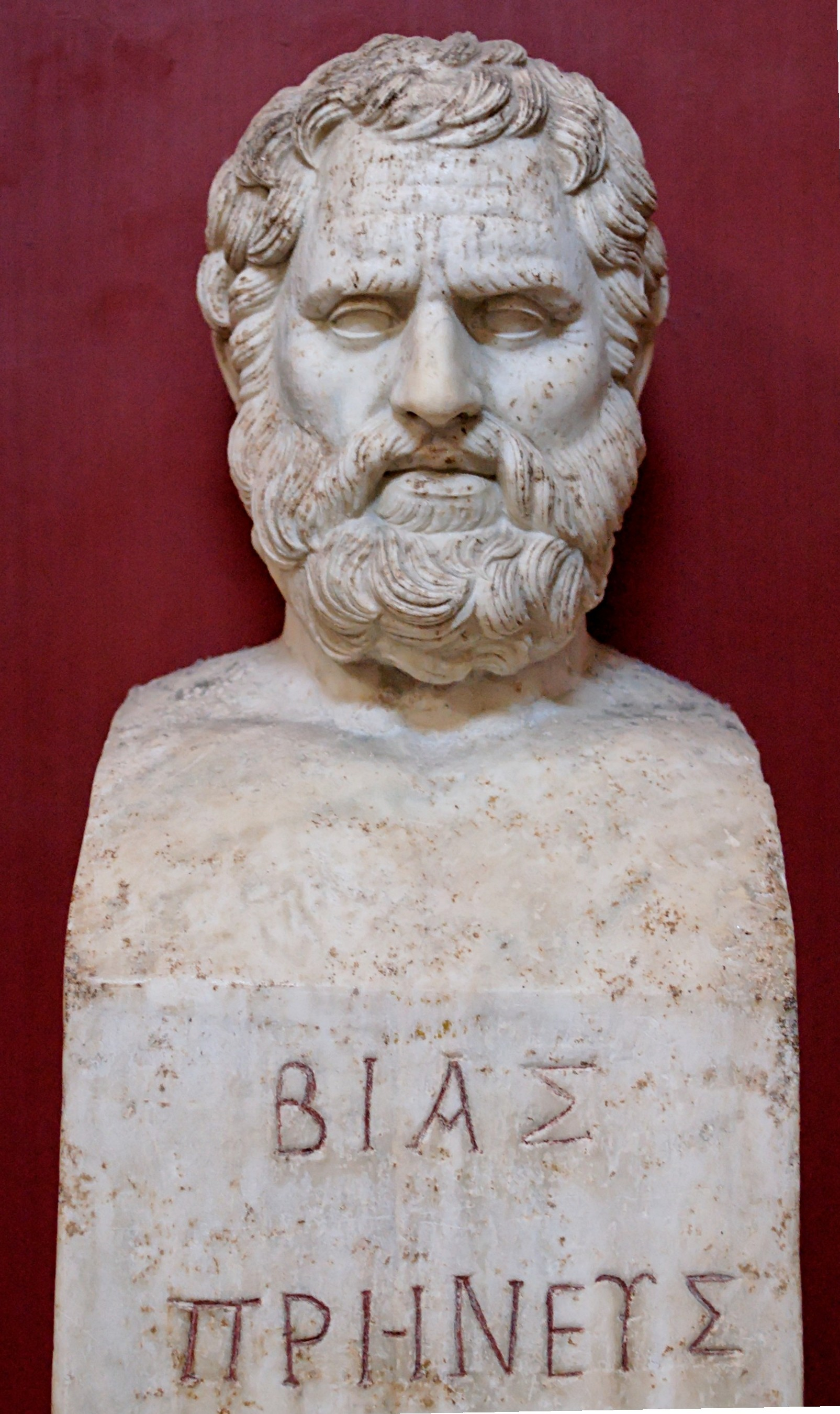
- Hermaic pillar representing Bias of Priene, Vatican Museums
- Born: c. 7th century BC; Priene
- Died: c. 6th century BC
- Occupation: Advocate

Philosophical work
- Era: Ancient philosophy
- Region: Ancient Greek philosophy
- School: Pre-Socratic philosophy
- Main interests: Human nature
- Notable ideas: "Most men are bad"

Bias of Priene (/ˈbaɪ.əs/; Ancient Greek: Βίας; fl. 6th century BC) was a Greek sage. He is widely accepted as one of the Seven Sages of Greece and spent his life working as a legal advocate free of charge for those who had been wronged. He also served as an envoy for Priene during mediation in a conflict with Samos, but he was unsuccessful.

Bias is known for his belief that most men are bad. He is also reported as saying that it is unfortunate not to be able to bear misfortune, that one should fear the gods and credit them for one's good deeds, and that wealth and material possessions are unimportant. Several tales are associated with Bias, saying that he refused a tripod rewarded to him for being the wisest man alive, that he paid the ransom for kidnapped girls from Messenia, and that he fooled the Lydian king Alyattes into thinking Priene was too well-stocked to besiege. Bias is said to have died while arguing a case before the court in his old age. He was celebrated in his home town of Priene, and he received praise from Heraclitus, who was known for disdaining historical figures.

== Life ==
Bias was born at Priene (modern-day Güllübahçe, Turkey) in Ionia and was active in the sixth century BC. He was the son of Teautames and a younger contemporary of Solon. He is said to have been descended from the Thebans who founded Priene; claims of Theban lineage were common among the Ionian aristocracy at the time. The exact span of Bias's life is unclear, as he has been described in the context of the Second Messenian War in the mid-7th century, the reign of the Lydian king Alyattes in the early-6th century, and the conquests of the Akkadian Empire in the mid-6th century. Diogenes Laertius reports that Duris of Samos called Bias a labourer while others described Bias as wealthy. As with other figures of this period, the distinction between historical events and legend is not always clear.

Bias is one of the four people who are consistently grouped as one of the Seven Sages of Greece, being named by Plato and Diogenes Laertius, among others. He was not a statesman like many of the other Sages, but he was active in politics as an advocate. He offered legal services for those who had been wronged, without requiring payment.

Bias traveled to Samos as an envoy to advocate for Priene in a territorial dispute between the two cities. He argued that the Batinetis belonged to Priene because it had been taken from them by the Cimmerians before it was captured by Samos. His argument was unsuccessful, and the mediator ruled in favour of Samos. Of the stories depicting Bias, his role as envoy is the most confidently determined to be true. This is the earliest known example of mediation, as opposed to arbitration, being used to end a conflict in ancient Greece.

According to Herodotus, Bias proposed a mass migration of the Ionians to create a unified settlement in Sardinia so they would be safe from attacks by Persia. Bias is among the earliest figures known to have discussed the Ionians as a single group. Herodotus also said that either Bias or Pittacus of Mytilene convinced the Lydian king Croesus not to build a fleet of ships to wage naval war with Greece, warning him that the seafaring Greeks would have the advantage.

According to Milesian legend, Bias was one of the Seven Sages who passed along a tripod that was awarded to the wisest living man. It had initially been given to Thales of Miletus, but Thales declared Bias wiser and gave it to him. Bias then passed it on to another of the Seven Sages and it continued changing hands. It is said that Bias eventually either suggested that the tripod be dedicated to Apollo or to Heracles. A local legend of Priene held that Bias paid the ransom for a group of Messenian girls who had been kidnapped by pirates, and that he treated them well as he returned them to their parents. This was followed by an alternate version of the story of the tripod, where it is said that a bronze tripod was found and awarded to him for his deeds, but he chose to dedicate it to Apollo.

Bias is said to have stopped the Lydian king Alyattes from besieging Priene by having two fattened mules sent out, demonstrating they had so much food to sustain them that even the animals could eat well. He is also said to have fooled them by gathering sand and laying corn on top so it appeared they had more food than they actually did. According to Diogenes Laertius, Alyattes later invited Bias to his court, only for Bias to respond that Alyattes should "make his diet of onions", meaning that he should cry.

Diogenes Laertius tells that when Bias was on a ship with impious men, Bias asked them not to pray for safety from a storm because it would only alert the gods to their presence, and that he refused to define piety to the impious because it did not concern them.

Bias is said to have died while making an argument before the court. As the judges decided in Bias's favour, they discovered that he had died with his head in his grandson's lap.

== Beliefs ==
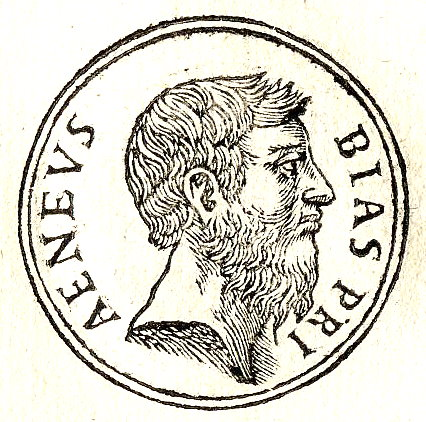
A 16th-century depiction of Bias by Guillaume Rouillé

Bias is known for a quote on human nature, which is variously translated as "the majority of men are bad", "most men are bad", or "most men are bad, few good". He also believed that friends should be treated as potential enemies and enemies should be treated as potential friends. According to Diogenes Laertius, Bias advocated the use of persuasion over force and believed it was preferable to settle a dispute among enemies, which would turn one of them into a friend, than to settle disputes among friends, which would turn one of them into an enemy. He is said to have believed one should try to be well-liked by the citizens where one resides.

Diogenes Laertius wrote on Bias's beliefs regarding misfortune and suffering. He said that Bias considered the inability to bear misfortune as being unfortunate in itself, and that Bias cited nobly enduring changes for the worse as an example of something difficult to do. Diogenes Laertius also reported that Bias discouraged excessive worry about the misfortunes of others, and that he believed one should prepare for both a short life and a long life.

Bias considered material possessions unimportant. One story tells that when Priene was attacked, he left without bringing his possessions because he believed his "letters and wisdom" constituted all of his belongings. According to Diogenes Laertius, Bias believed that individual strength comes from nature and anyone can become wealthy by chance, but promoting one's country comes from reason. He reported that Bias deemed making money to be the most pleasurable occupation, but that he said that one should not seek things that are impossible to obtain. Bias is also said to have discouraged praise for the wealthy if they were otherwise unworthy.

Bias said that one should have "piety in fear", reflecting the common belief that fearing the gods was respectful. Diogenes Laertius reported that Bias said one should admit the existence of gods and credit them for one's good actions.

Bias believed that one should be cautious in making a decision and commit to it once it is made. Diogenes Laertius said that Bias considered it a sign of madness when one was too quick to speak.

== Legacy ==
Bias's belief that most men are bad earned him the praise of Heraclitus, who considered him the greatest of the Seven Sages. Bias was the one exception to Heraclitus's scorn of his predecessors. Theophrastus and Satyrus the Peripatetic similarly considered Bias to be the greatest of the Seven Sages. Bias's beliefs on the temporary nature of friendship and enmity was referenced by Sophocles in his play Ajax; the character Ajax the Great says that emotional relations should instead be absolute commitments, and that death is the only way to escape their impermanence.

Bias was famous in Priene, and it established a heroic cult around him following his death. The city erected a heroon in his honour, and it minted coins in the second century BC depicting him with his tripod. Diogenes Laertius included Bias in his Lives and Opinions of Eminent Philosophers, which is where most information about Bias has been preserved for modern study. He said that Demodocus of Leros and Hipponax both used Bias as an example of one who mastered pleading cases.
