= Hermogenes of Priene =

Greek temple architect

Hermogenes of Priene (late 3rd - early 2nd century BC) was a Hellenistic Greek architect, best known for designing a temple of Artemis Leukophryene (Artemision) at Magnesia in Lydia, an Ionian colony on the banks of the Maeander river in Anatolia.

== Biography ==
Hermogenes was a citizen of Priene in Ionia. He is considered the most important architect of the Ionic style. Around 150 BC, Hermogenes codified the rules for the Ionic order in books, which were then passed down to the Romans, particularly the 1st-century Roman architect Vitruvius (De architectura, books iii, 2 and 6). Among his opinions were that the Doric style should not be used for building temples; he transformed the Dionysian temple (likely at Teos) which had been built in the Doric style to the Ionic.

Hermogenes' rules on symmetry and proportion define what Vitruvius calls "eustyle" (eu stylos "right column"), an architectural ideal that prescribed a series of proportional relationships for temples that was all derived from the diameter of the column, as a module or unit of measure. Ideal "eustyle" intercolumniation (the space between the columns) should be two-and-a-quarter column-thicknesses, and the height of the Ionic column nine-and-a-half times its diameter. If the intercolumniation was to be tighter, columns should be taller in their proportions, and thicker if they were farther spaced. It is this sense of rational relations that Vitruvius is expressing when he writes "in the members of a temple there ought to be the greatest harmony in the symmetrical relations of the different parts to the general magnitude of the whole." One element in a classical system cannot be changed without changing the other proportions too.

The geographer Strabo mentions this temple, the third greatest temple after those in Didyma and Ephesus, but considered finest of all for its proportions.

Consequently, archaeologists have been curious to rediscover the site of Hermogenes' temple, traces of which are not apparent. Even the site of the colony of the mother-city of Magnesia in Thessaly was not established until W. M. Leake got the site correctly identified in 1824 (Journal of a Tour in Asia Minor pp 242ff). In the winter of 1842–3, a French team struggled with swampy ground and a high water table at the heavily sedimented site, and succeeded in removing 40 meters of the temple's frieze, comprising 41 blocks, and some other architectural elements. These were taken to the Louvre Museum, but the excavations were never published. In 1887 Osman Hamdi Bey, director of the Archaeological Museums of Constantinople, carried off to Constantinople a further 20 meters of frieze blocks from the Artemision. More rigorous excavations at Magnesia were undertaken by the German Institute at Constantinople in the 1890s and by German and Turkish scholars since 1984. The result is that sculptural elements of Hermogenes' Artemision are scattered among the Pergamum Museum, Berlin, the Louvre Museum, Paris, and Istanbul.

Since the 1980s, enough remnants of the U-shaped raised colonnaded altar that faced the temple have been recovered to permit modern reconstructions of its original appearance, for the first time since Antiquity.

Hermogenes was the architect of the hexastyle peripteral Temple of Dionysus in Teos, also mentioned by Vitruvius. It was the largest temple to Dionysus in the ancient world; only the platform (stylobate) remains, measuring 18.5 by 35 meters (61 by 115 ft). It is in the western part of the lower city, against the walls. It was constructed early in the 2nd century BC and later reconsecrated to the cult of Tiberius and partly rebuilt during Hadrian’s reign. The temple has been excavated by a team of the University of Ankara.

Hermogenes also appears to have written a text, no longer extant, on his symmetrical principles. (De architectura 3.3.9)

== Bibliography ==
- Haselberger, Lothar (2020). Der Pergamonaltar und der Architekt Hermogenes. Schatten, Raum und Wahrnehmung [The Pergamon Altar and the architect Hermogenes. Shadow, Space and Perception]. Berlin: Reimer. ISBN 978-3-496-01597-0.
- Zarmakoupi, Mantha, ed. (2026-04-14). Hermogenes and Hellenistic-Roman Temple Building. The University of Wisconsin Press. ISBN 978-0299355203.
