= Hans Schrader =

German classical archaeologist and art historian

Johann (Hans) Hermann Schrader (15 February 1869, Stolp – 5 November 1948, Berlin) was a German classical archaeologist and art historian.

He was a student at the Universities of Marburg and Berlin, where he was a pupil of Reinhard Kekulé von Stradonitz. After obtaining his doctorate, he, along with Theodor Wiegand, received a travel grant from the German Archaeological Institute (DAI). Subsequently, he relocated to Athens, where under the leadership of Wilhelm Dörpfeld, he took part in excavations at the Athenian Acropolis. Here, he was entrusted with processing ancient marble sculptures, a main theme of his future research.

In 1896, under the leadership of Carl Humann, he began excavatory work at Priene (Asia Minor). Here, he worked alongside Theodor Wiegand. After Humann's death later the same year, he continued work at Priene up until 1899.

From 1899 to 1901 he worked as an assistant director of Berlin museums, afterwards serving as second secretary of the German Archaeological Institute at Athens (1901–05). In 1905 he was appointed professor of classical archaeology at the University of Innsbruck, followed by professorships at the Universities of Graz (from 1908) and Vienna (from 1910). At Vienna he was also in charge of the collection of antiquities. In 1914 he accepted a professorial post at the newly established University of Frankfurt.

Schrader made significant contributions towards the reconstruction of Pergamon Altar as well as to the final assembly of the so-called "Kritios Boy" of the Athenian Acropolis.

== Principal works ==
- Priene : Ergebnisse der ausgrabungen und untersuchungen in den jahren 1895-1898, (with Theodor Wiegand), 1904 – Priene: Results of excavations and investigations in the years 1895–1898).
- Archaische Marmor-Skulpturen im Akropolis-Museum zu Athen, 1909 – Ancient marble sculptures at the Acropolis Museum of Athens.
- Auswahl archaischer Marmor-Skulpturen im Akropolis-Museum, 1913 – Selection of ancient marble sculptures at the Acropolis Museum.
- Phidias, 1924 – Phidias.
- Archaische griechische Plastik, 1933 – Ancient Greek sculpture.
