= Theodor Wiegand =

German archaeologist (1864–1936)

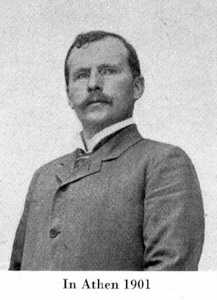
Theodor Wiegand

Theodor Wiegand (30 October 1864 – 19 December 1936) was a German archaeologist.

Wiegand was born in Bendorf, Rhenish Prussia. He studied at the Ludwig-Maximilians-Universität München, the Friedrich Wilhelm University of Berlin, and the University of Freiburg. In 1894, he worked under Wilhelm Dörpfeld at the excavation of the Athenian Acropolis. From 1895 until 1899, he excavated the ancient Greek city of Priene, and from 1899 to 1911 he worked at Miletus. He took part in the excavations of the sanctuary of Didyma (1905–1911) and of Samos (1910–1911). In Pergamon he discovered, in 1927, the arsenals of the castle at the acropolis and excavated the large sanctuary of Asklepios outside the city. He also finished the excavations at Baalbek in Lebanon and published the results.

From 1899 until 1911, he worked for the museums of Berlin as a foreign director in Constantinople, the capital of the Ottoman Empire, and was the science attaché of the German Embassy there. From 1912 to 1930 he worked as the director of the Department of Antiquities in the museums of Berlin, when they built the Pergamon Museum for ancient architecture that houses part of the Antikensammlung collection, along with the Altes Museum.

In 1922, Wiegand was accepted as a full member of the Prussian Academy of Sciences. In 1930, the year he retired from the Prussian civil service, he was elected a member of the Göttingen Academy of Sciences. In 1931, he was made a member of the civil order Pour le Mérite for Science and Art and, in 1932, he was elected to the presidency of the German Archaeological Institute. On 11 July 1933, Prussian Minister President Hermann Göring appointed him to the recently reconstituted Prussian State Council. He was one of the signatories of an open letter by German scientists in August 1934, endorsing Adolf Hitler succeeding Paul Hindenburg as German head of state.

Wiegand died in Berlin of late effects of malaria in December 1936. He is buried at the Waldfriedhof Dahlem.

== Selected works ==
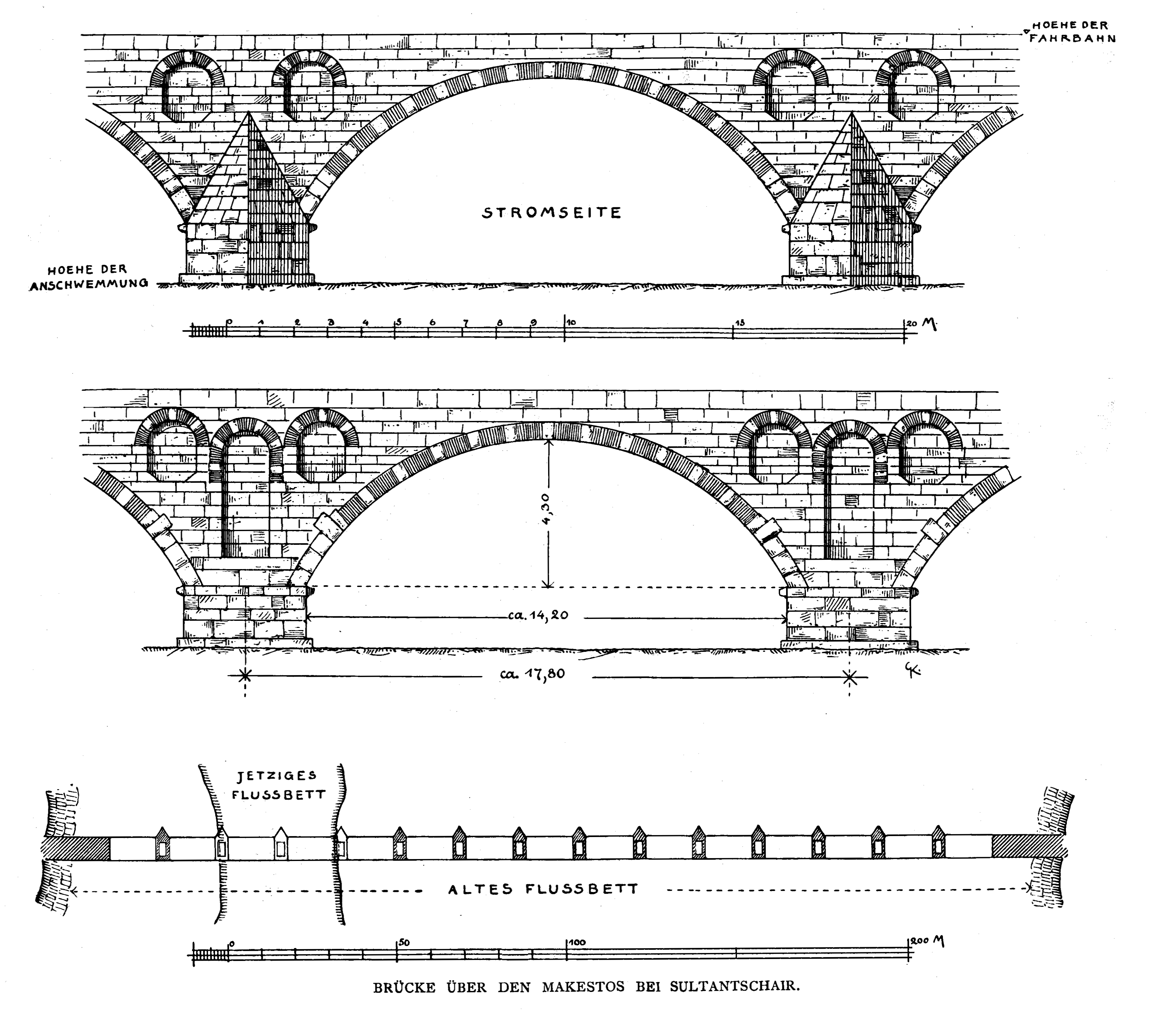
The late Roman Makestos Bridge, discovered and drawn by Wiegand during one of his many exploration tours in Asia Minor.

- Priene: ergebnisse er ausgrabungen und untersuchungen in den jahren 1895-1898, (with Hans Schrader), Royal Museums of Berlin, 1904 – Priene, the results of excavations and investigations in the years 1895-1898.
- Die archaische Poros-Architektur der Akropolis zu Athen, German Academy of Sciences in Berlin, 1904 – The archaic Poros architecture of the Acropolis at Athens.
- Milet : Ergebnisse der Ausgrabungen und Untersuchungen seit dem Jahre 1899, German Archaeological Institute. Staatliche Museen zu Berlin, 1906 – Miletus: results of excavations and investigations since 1899.
- Baalbek : Ergebnisse der Ausgrabungen und Untersuchungen in den Jahren 1898 bis 1905, (as editor) – Baalbek: results of excavations and investigations in the years 1898-1905.
- Alte Denkma¨ler aus Syrien, Pala¨stina und Westarabien; 100 Tafeln mit beschreibendem Text, vero¨ffentlicht auf Befehl von Ahmed Djemal Pascha, 1918 – Ancient monuments of Syria, Palestine and western Arabia; 100 plates with descriptive text, released on the orders of Ahmed Djemal.
- Sinai (with contributions by Friedrich Freiherr Kress von Kressenstein, et al.), 1920.
- Bericht über die Ausgrabungen in Pergamon 1927, Berlin : Verlag der Akademie der Wissenschaften, in Kommission bei W. de Gruyter, 1928 – Report on the excavations at Pergamon, 1927.
- Zweiter Bericht über die Ausgrabungen in Pergamon 1928-32 – Second report on the excavations at Pergamon.
- Der Entdecker von Pergamon, Carl Humann, ein Lebensbild, Berlin, G. Grote (with Carl Schuchhardt), 1931 – The discoverer of Pergamon, Carl Humann. A life image.
