= Priene =

Ancient Greek city of Ionia

- Πριήνη (Ancient Greek); Prien (Turkish)
- Sampson
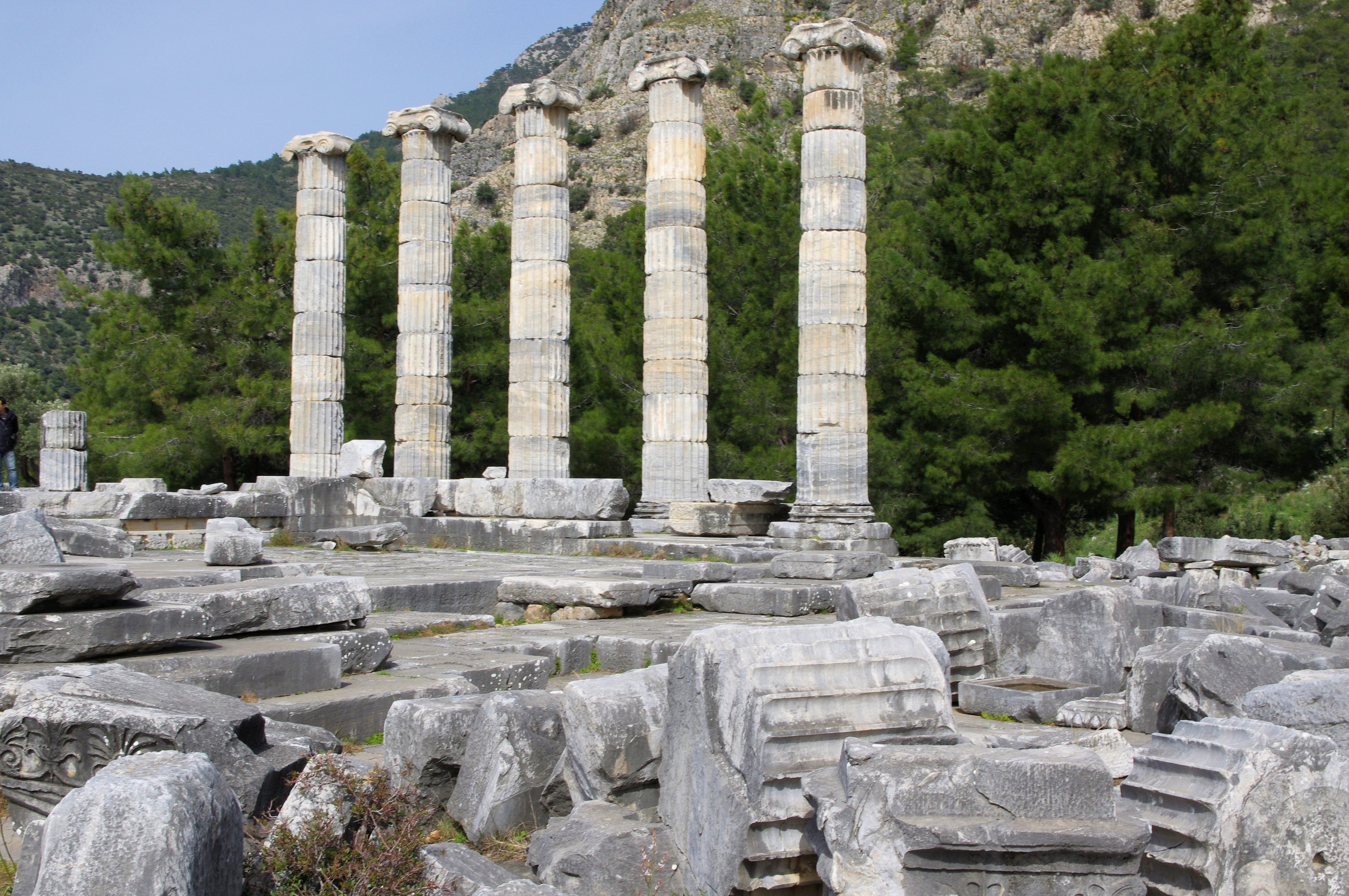
- The Temple of Athena, funded by Alexander the Great, at the foot of an escarpment of Mycale. The five columns were erected in 1965–66 from rubble and are 3 metres (9.8 ft) shorter of the calculated original column height.

- Location within Turkey
- 37°39′35″N 27°17′52″E
- Type: Settlement
- Associated with: Bias, Pythius
- Location: Güllübahçe, Söke, Aydın Province, Turkey
- Region: Ionia

History
- Built: Approximately 1000 BCE
- Built by: Theban colonists

Site notes
- Area: 37 ha (91 acres)

Priene (Ancient Greek: Πριήνη, romanized: Priēnē; Turkish: Prien) was an ancient Greek city of Ionia (and member of the Ionian League) located at the base of an escarpment of Mycale, about 6 kilometres (3.7 mi) north of what was then the course of the Maeander River (now called the Büyük Menderes or "Greater Maeander"). It was 67 kilometres (42 mi) from ancient Anthea, 15 kilometres (9.3 mi) from ancient Aneon and 25 kilometres (16 mi) from ancient Miletus. The city was built on the sea coast, overlooking the former Latmian Gulf of the Aegean. It was developed on steep slopes and terraces extending from sea level to a height of 380 metres (1,250 ft) above sea level at the top of the escarpment. Because of siltation from the river filling the bay over several centuries, the city is now an inland site. It is located at a short distance west of the modern village Güllübahçe Turun in the Söke district of Aydın Province, Turkey.

Priene is known to have been the site of high-quality Hellenistic art and architecture. The city's original position on Mount Mycale has never been discovered; however, it is believed that it was on a peninsula with two harbours. Priene never held a great deal of political importance due to the city's relatively limited size, as it is believed around four to five thousand inhabitants occupied the region. The city was arranged into four districts, firstly the political district, which consisted of the bouleuterion and the prytaneion; the cultural district containing the theatre; the commercial, where the agora was located; and finally the religious district, which contained sanctuaries dedicated to Zeus, Demeter and, most importantly, the Temple of Athena.

== Geography ==
=== Earliest cities ===
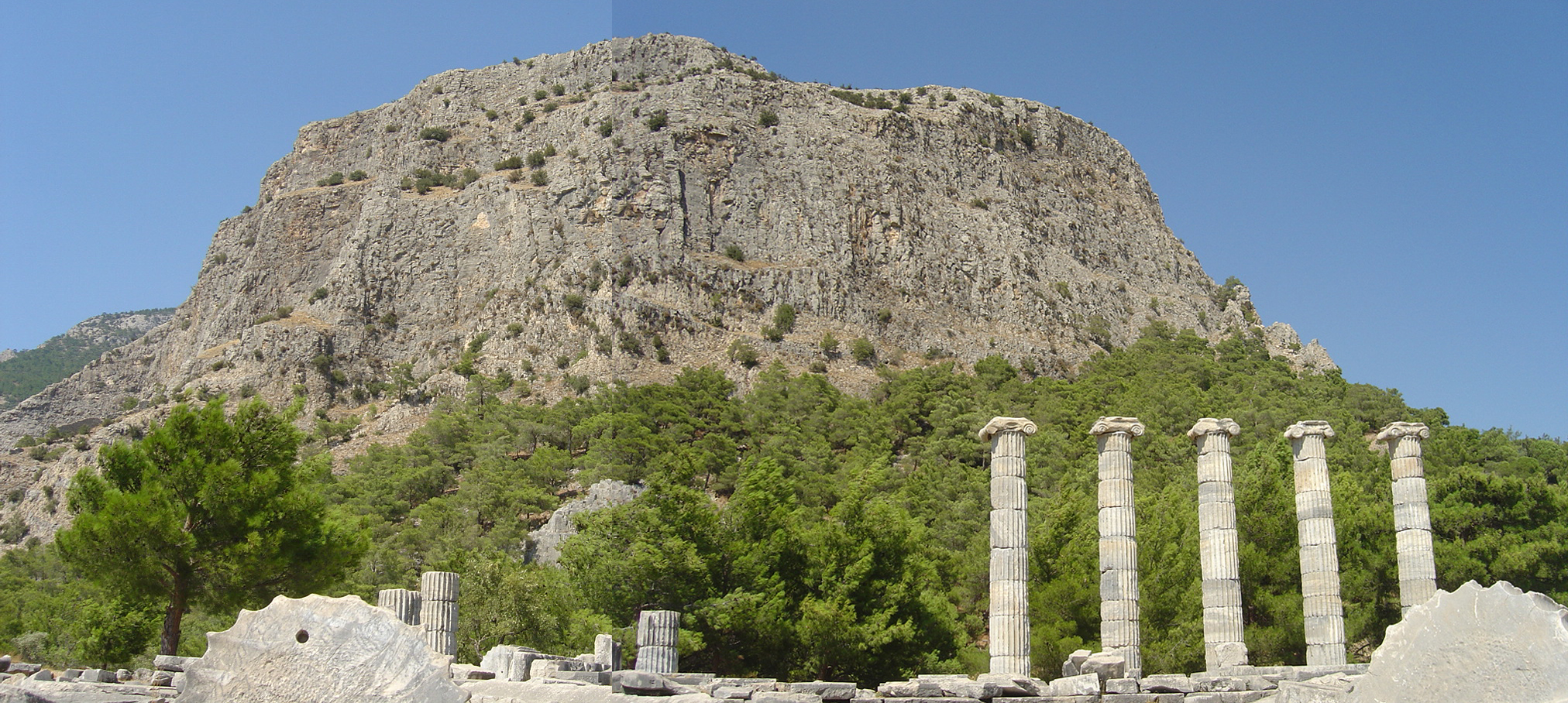
The cliff side of the acropolis, with the Temple of Athena in the foreground

The city visible on the slopes and escarpment of Mycale was constructed according to plan entirely during the 4th century BCE. The original Priene had been a port city situated at the then mouth of the Maeander River. This location caused insuperable environmental difficulties, due to slow aggradation of the riverbed and progradation in the direction of the Aegean Sea. Typically the harbour would silt over, so that residents were living in pest-ridden swamps and marshes.

The Maeander flows through a slowly subsiding rift valley, creating a drowned coastline. Human use of the previously forested slopes and valley removed trees and exposed soils to erosion. The sediments were progressively deposited in the trough at the mouth of the river, which migrated westward and more than compensated for the subsidence.

Physical remains of the original Priene have not yet been identified. It is believed they are likely to be buried under many feet of sediment. The top is now cultivated as valuable agricultural land. Knowledge of the average rate of progradation is the basis for estimating the location of the city, which was moved closer to the water again every few centuries in order to operate as a port.

The Greek city (there may have been unknown habitations of other ethnicities, as at Miletus) was founded by a colony from the ancient Greek city of Thebes in the vicinity of ancient Aneon at about 1000 BCE. At about 700 BCE a series of earthquakes were the catalyst to move the city to within 8 kilometres (5.0 mi) of its 4th century BCE location. At about 500 BCE, the city moved again to the port of Naulochos.

=== 4th century BCE city ===
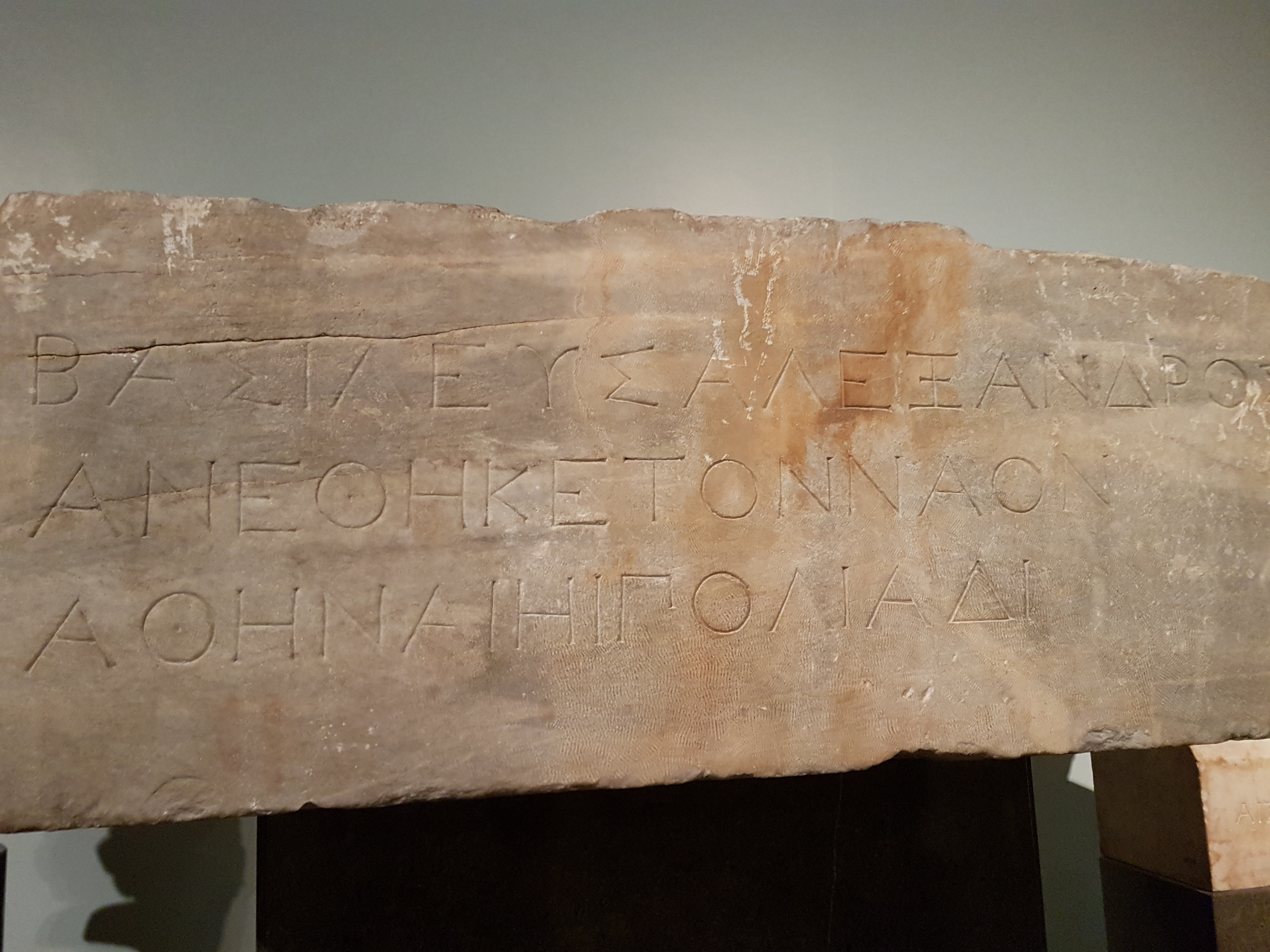
Dedication of Alexander the Great to Athena Polias at Priene. British Museum

At about 350 BCE the Persian-empire satrap, Mausolus (a Carian), planned a magnificent new city on the steep slopes of Mycale. He hoped it could be a permanent deep-water port (similar to the many Greek island cities, located on and up seaside escarpments). Construction had begun when the Macedonians took the region from the Persian Empire, and Alexander the Great personally assumed responsibility for the development. He and Mausolus intended to make Priene a model city. Alexander offered to pay for construction of the Temple of Athena to designs of the noted architect Pytheos, if it would be dedicated by him, which it was, in 323 BCE. The dedicatory inscription is held by the British Museum. The inscription translated to: "King Alexander dedicated the temple to Athena Polias".

The leading citizens were quick to follow suit: most of the public buildings were constructed at private expense and are inscribed with the names of the donors.

The ruins of the city are generally conceded to be the most spectacular surviving example of an entire ancient Greek city; it is intact except for the ravages of time. It has been studied since at least the 18th century. The city was constructed of marble from nearby quarries on Mycale, and wood for such items as roofs and floors. The public area is laid out in a grid pattern up the steep slopes, drained by a system of channels. The water distribution and sewer systems survive. Foundations, paved streets, stairways, partial door frames, monuments, walls, terraces can be seen everywhere among toppled columns and blocks. No wood has survived. The city extends upward to the base of an escarpment projecting from Mycale. A narrow path leads to the acropolis above.

=== Later years ===
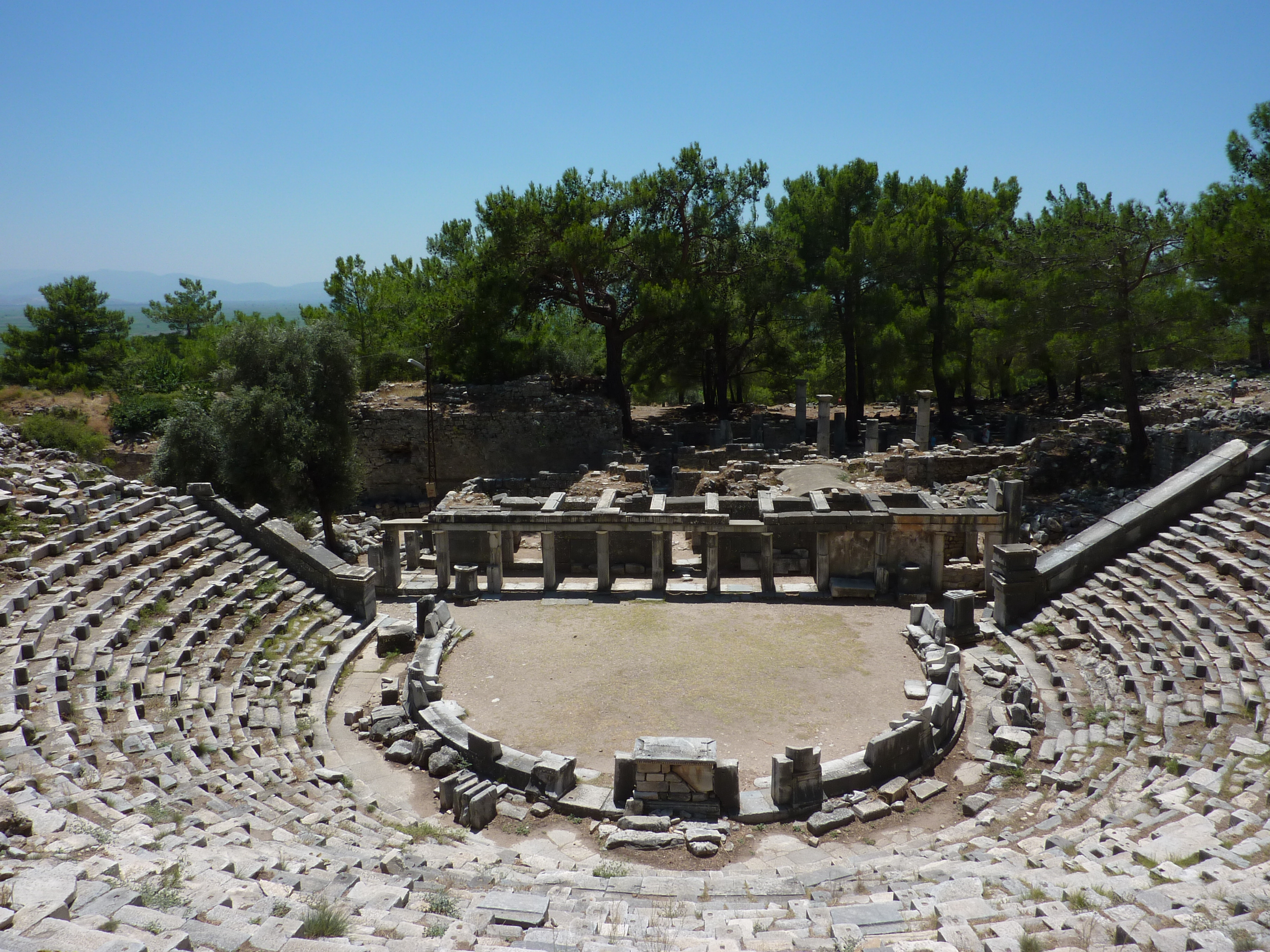
Greek theatre at Priene

Despite the expectations, Priene lasted only a few centuries as a deep-water port. In the 2nd century CE Pausanias reports that the Maeander already had silted over the inlet in which Myus stood, and that the population had abandoned it for Miletus. While Miletus apparently still had an open port then, according to recent geoarchaeological research, Priene had already lost the port and open connection to the sea in about the 1st century BCE. Its merchants likely had preceded most residents in relocation to Miletus. By 300 CE the entire Bay of Miletus, except for Lake Bafa, was silted in.

Today Miletus is many miles from the sea. Priene stands at the edge of a fertile plain, now a checkerboard of privately owned fields. A Greek village remained after the population decline. After the 12th century CE, more Turkish people moved into the area. In the 13th century CE Priene was known as "Sampson", in Greek, after the biblical hero Samson (Samsun Kale, "Samson's Castle" in Turkish). In 1204, Sabas Asidenos, a local magnate, established himself as the city's ruler, but soon had to recognize the rule of the Empire of Nicaea. The area remained under Byzantine control until the late 13th century.

By 1923, whatever Greek population remained was expelled in the population exchange between Greece and Turkey following World War I. Shortly after, the Turkish population moved to a more favourable location, which they called Güllü Bahçe ("rose garden"). The old Greek settlement, partly still in use, is today known as Gelebeç or Kelebeş. The tourist attraction of Priene is accessible from there.

== Contemporary geography ==
=== Territory ===
Location of Priene at Maeander River's mouth

In the 4th century BCE, Priene was a deep-water port with two harbours overlooking the Bay of Miletus and, somewhat further east, the marshes of the Maeander Delta. Between the ocean and steep Mycale, agricultural resources were limited. Priene's territory likely included a part of the Maeander Valley, needed to support the city. Claiming much of Mycale, it had borders on the north with Ephesus and Thebes, a small state on Mycale.

Priene was a small city-state of 6000 persons living in a constrained space of only 15 hectares (37 acres). The walled area had an extent of 20 hectares (49 acres) to 37 hectares (91 acres). The population density of its residential district has been estimated at 166 persons per hectare, living in about 33 homes per hectare (13 per acre) arranged in compact city blocks. The entire space within the walls offered not much more space and privacy: the density was 108 persons per hectare. All the public buildings were within walking distance, except that walking must have been an athletic event due to the vertical components of the distances.

=== Society ===
Priene was a wealthy city, as the plenitude of fine urban homes in marble and the private dedications of public buildings suggests. In addition, historical references to the interest of Mausolus and Alexander the Great indicate its standing. One third of the houses had indoor toilets, a rarity in this society. Typically cities had public banks of outdoor seats, side by side, an arrangement for which the flowing robes of the ancients were suitably functional. Indoor plumbing requires more extensive water supply and sewage systems. Priene's location was appropriate in that regard; they captured springs and streams on Mycale, brought the water in by aqueduct to cisterns, and piped or channeled from there to houses and fountains. Most Greek cities, such as Athens, required getting water from the public fountains (which was the work of domestic servants). The upper third of Prienean society had access to indoor water.

The source of Ionian wealth was maritime activity; Ionia had a reputation among the other Greeks for being luxurious. The intellectuals, such as Heraclitus, often railed against their practices.

=== Government ===
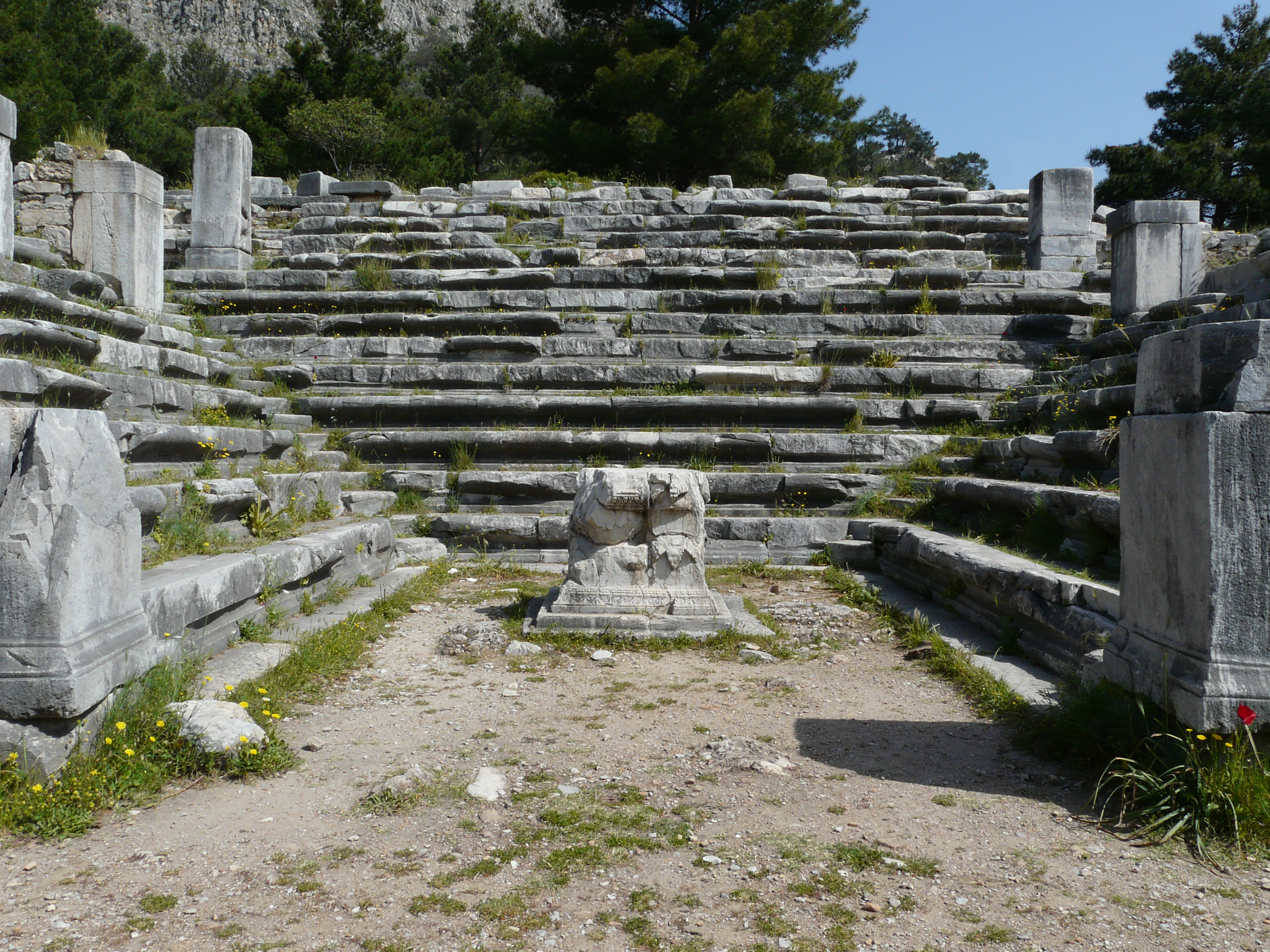
Bouleuterion

Although the stereotyped equation of wealth with aristocracy may have applied early in Priene's history, in the 4th century BCE the city-state was a democracy. State authority resided in a body called the Πριηνείς (Priēneis), "the Prieneian people", who issued all decrees and other public documents in their name. The coins minted at Priene featured the helmeted head of Athena on the obverse and a meander pattern on the reverse; one coin also displayed a dolphin and the legend ΠΡΙΗ for ΠΡΙΗΝΕΩΝ (Priēneōn), "of the Prieneians." These symbols express the Prieneians identification as a maritime democracy aligned with Athens but located in Asia.

The mechanism of democracy was similar to but simpler than that of the Athenians (whose population was much larger.) An assembly of citizens met periodically to render major decisions placed before them. The day-to-day legislative and executive business was conducted by a boulē, or city council, which met in a bouleuterion, a space like a small theatre with a wooden roof. The official head of state was a prytane. He and more specialized magistrates were elected periodically. As at Athens, not all the population was franchised. For example, the property rights and tax responsibilities of a non-Prieneian section of the population living in the countryside, the pedieis, "plainsmen", were defined by law. They were perhaps, an inheritance from the days when Priene was in the valley.

== History ==
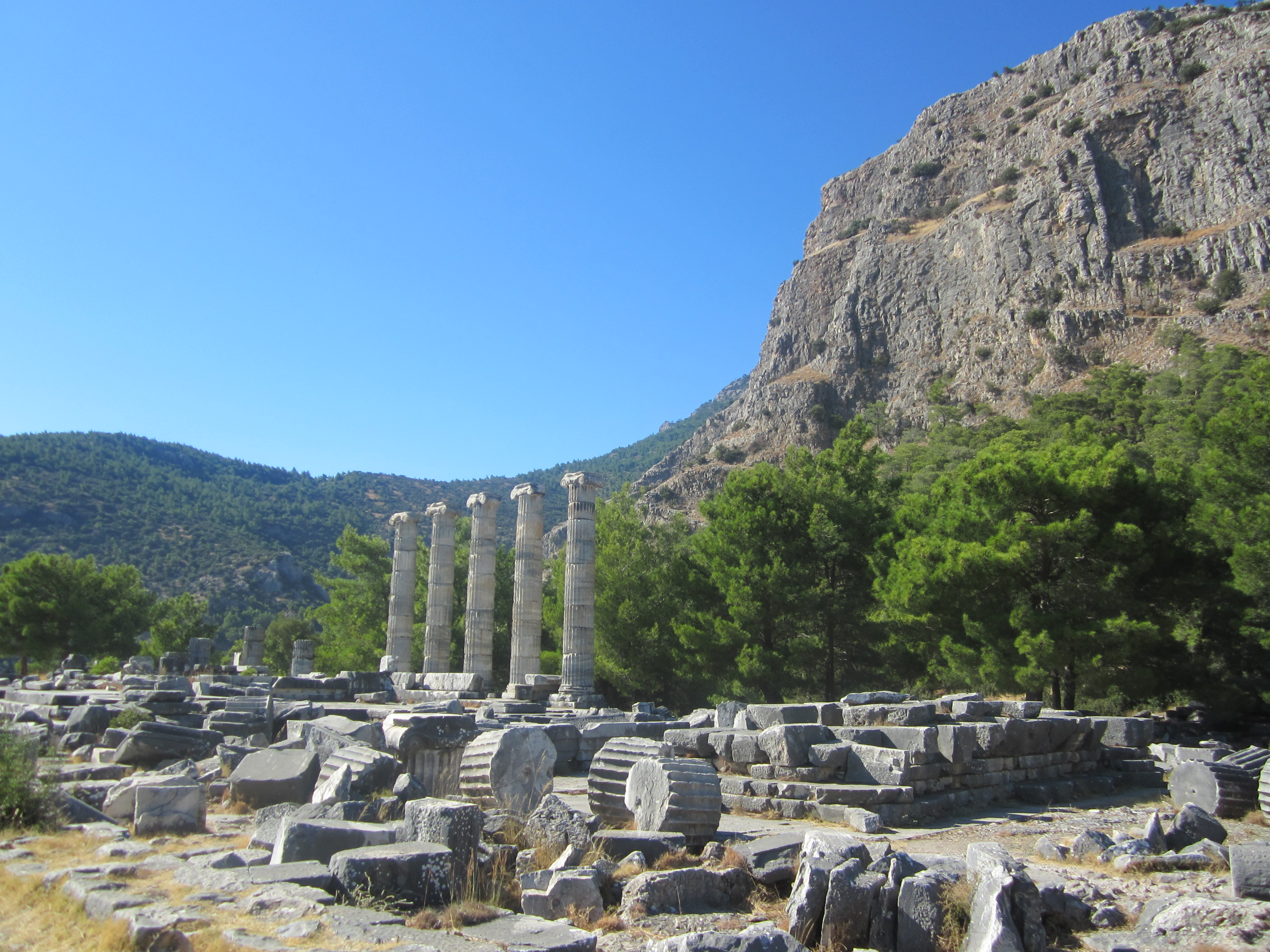
Temple of Athena at Priene

Priene was said to have been first settled by Ionians under Aegyptus, a son of Belus and grandson of King Codrus, in the 11th century BCE. After successive attacks by Cimmerians, Lydians under Ardys, and Persians, it survived and prospered under the direction of its "sage," Bias, during the middle of the 6th century BCE. Cyrus captured it in 545 BCE; but it was able to send twelve ships to join the Ionic Revolt (499 BCE-494 BCE).

Priene was a member of the Athenian-dominated Delian League in the 5th century BCE. In 387 BCE it came under Persian dominance again, which lasted until Alexander the Great's conquest. Disputes with Samos, and the troubles after Alexander's death, brought Priene low. Rome had to save it from the kings of Pergamon and Cappadocia in 155.

Orophernes, the rebellious brother of the Cappadocian king, who had deposited a treasure there and recovered it by Roman intervention, restored the Temple of Athena as a thank-offering. Under Roman and Byzantine dominion Priene had a prosperous history. It passed into Muslim hands late in the 13th century.

== Archaeological excavations and current state ==
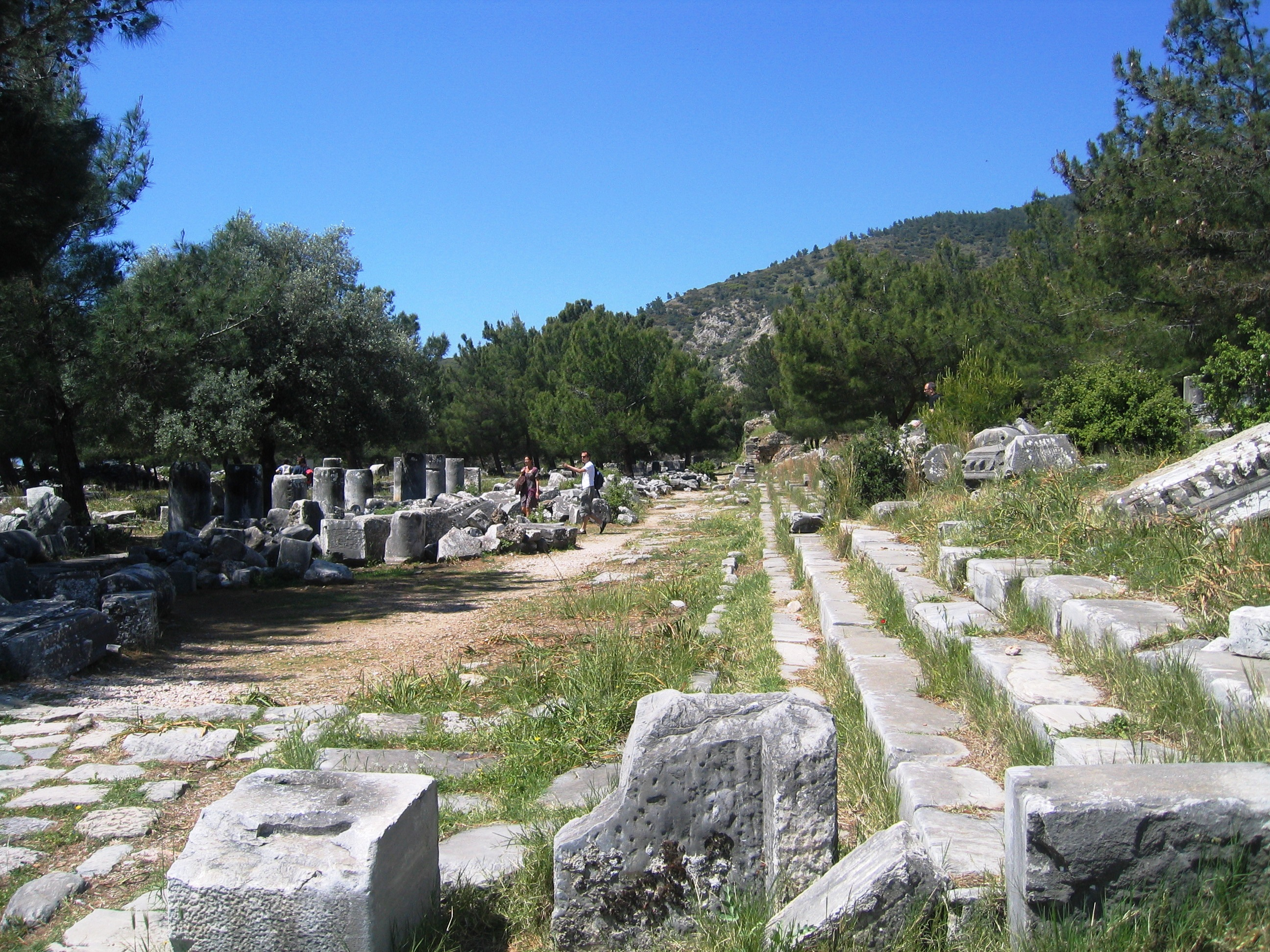
The main street

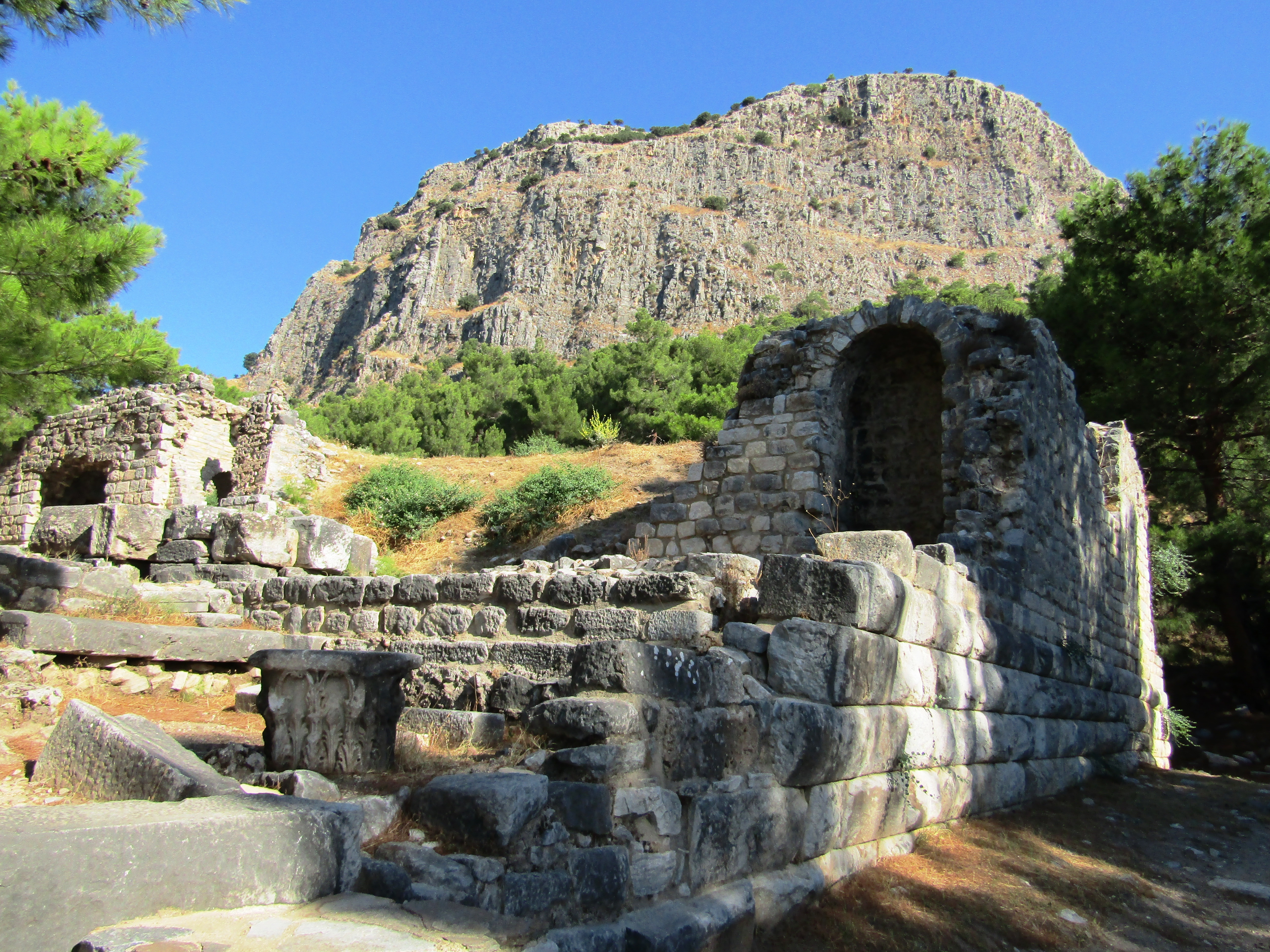
The Roman baths

The ruins, which fell on the successive terraces where they were built, were the object of investigatory missions sent out by the English Society of Dilettanti in 1765 and 1868. They were excavated by Theodor Wiegand (1895–1899) for the Berlin Museum.

The city, as developed at this site that was new in the 4th century, was found to have been laid out on a rectangular scheme. The steep area faces south, the acropolis rising nearly 200 metres (660 ft) behind it. The city was enclosed by a wall 2 metres (6 ft 7 in) thick, with towers at intervals and three principal gates.

On the lower slopes of the acropolis was a sanctuary of Demeter. The town had six main streets, about 6 metres (20 ft) wide, running east and west, and fifteen streets about 3 metres (9.8 ft) wide crossing at right angles, all being evenly spaced. It was thus divided into about 80 insulae. Private houses were apportioned eight to an insula. The systems of water-supply and drainage are still visible. The houses present many analogies with the earliest ones of Pompeii.

In the western half of the city, on a high terrace north of the main street and approached by a fine stairway, was the temple of Athena Polias. It was a hexastyle peripteral structure in the Ionic order built by Pytheos, the architect of the Mausoleum of Maussollos at Halikarnassos, one of the Seven Wonders of the Ancient World. In 1870, silver tetradrachms of Orophernes, and some jewellery were found in excavations under the base of the statue of Athena. These were probably deposited at the time of the Cappadocian restoration.

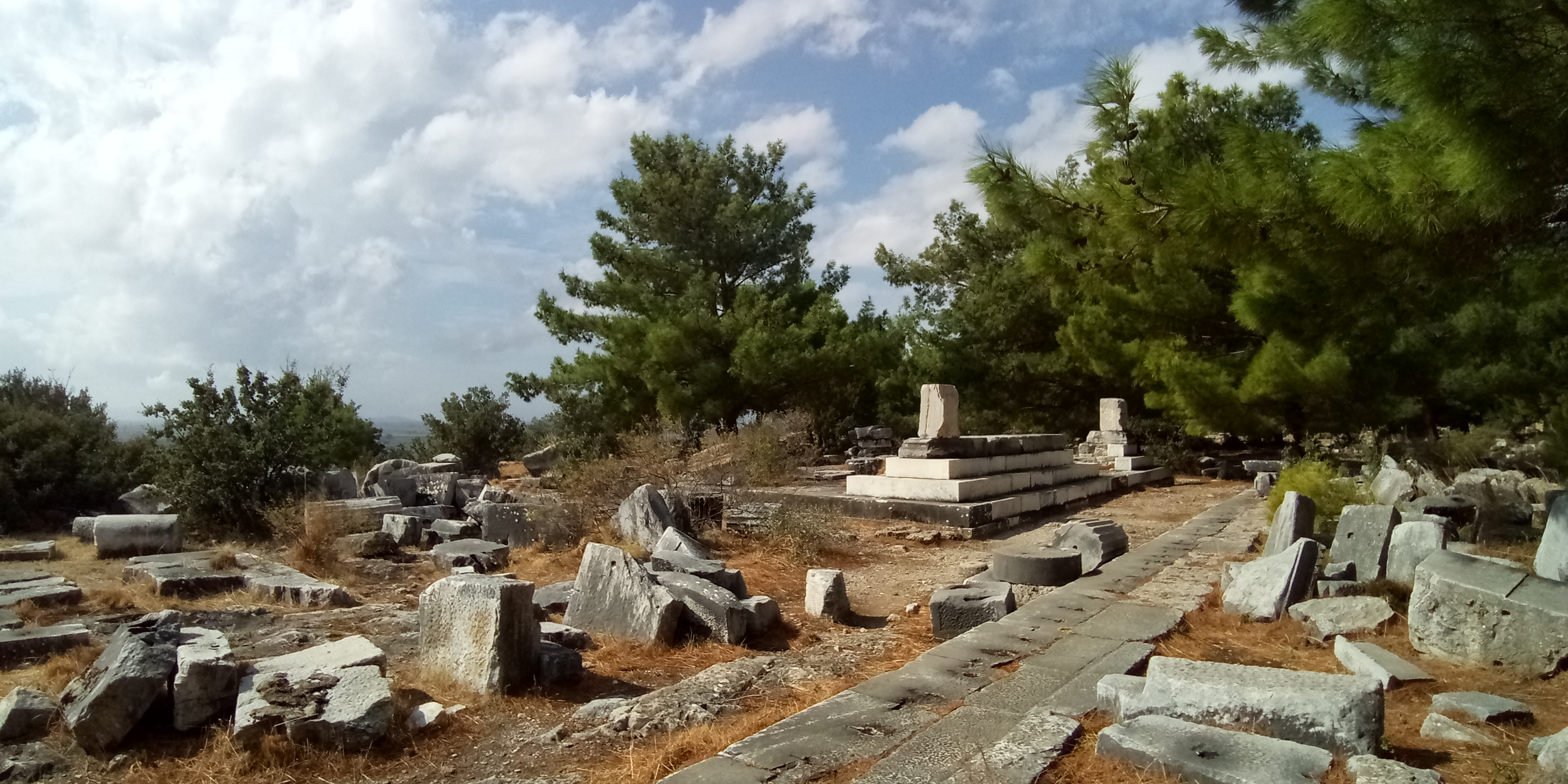
The sanctuary of Asclepius

An ancient Priene Synagogue, with carved images of the menorah, has also been discovered.

Around the agora, the main square crossed by the main street, is a series of halls. The municipal buildings, buleuterion and prytaneion, lie north of the agora. Further to the north is the Upper Gymnasium with Roman baths, and the well-preserved Hellenistic theatre. These and most other public structures are at the centre of the plan. Temples of Asclepius and the Egyptian gods Isis, Serapis and Anubis, have been revealed. At the lowest point on the south, within the walls, was the large stadium. In Hellenistic times, it was connected with a gymnasium.

A stone in the monumental stairway leading from the agora to the sacred stoa is engraved with a menorah and a shofar, alongside a cross, gladiators, phallic symbols, tridents, circles, and other graffiti. The presence of these motifs on the same stone has been interpreted as possibly reflecting tensions or competition between Jewish and Christian communities.

== See also ==
- Calendar Inscription of Priene
- List of ancient Greek cities
