= Güllübahçe, Söke =

Güllübahçe
- Neighbourhood
- Location in Turkey Güllübahçe (Turkey Aegean)
- Coordinates: 37°40′N 27°20′E
- Country: Turkey
- Province: Aydın
- District: Söke
- Population (2022): 1,324
- Time zone: UTC+3 (TRT)

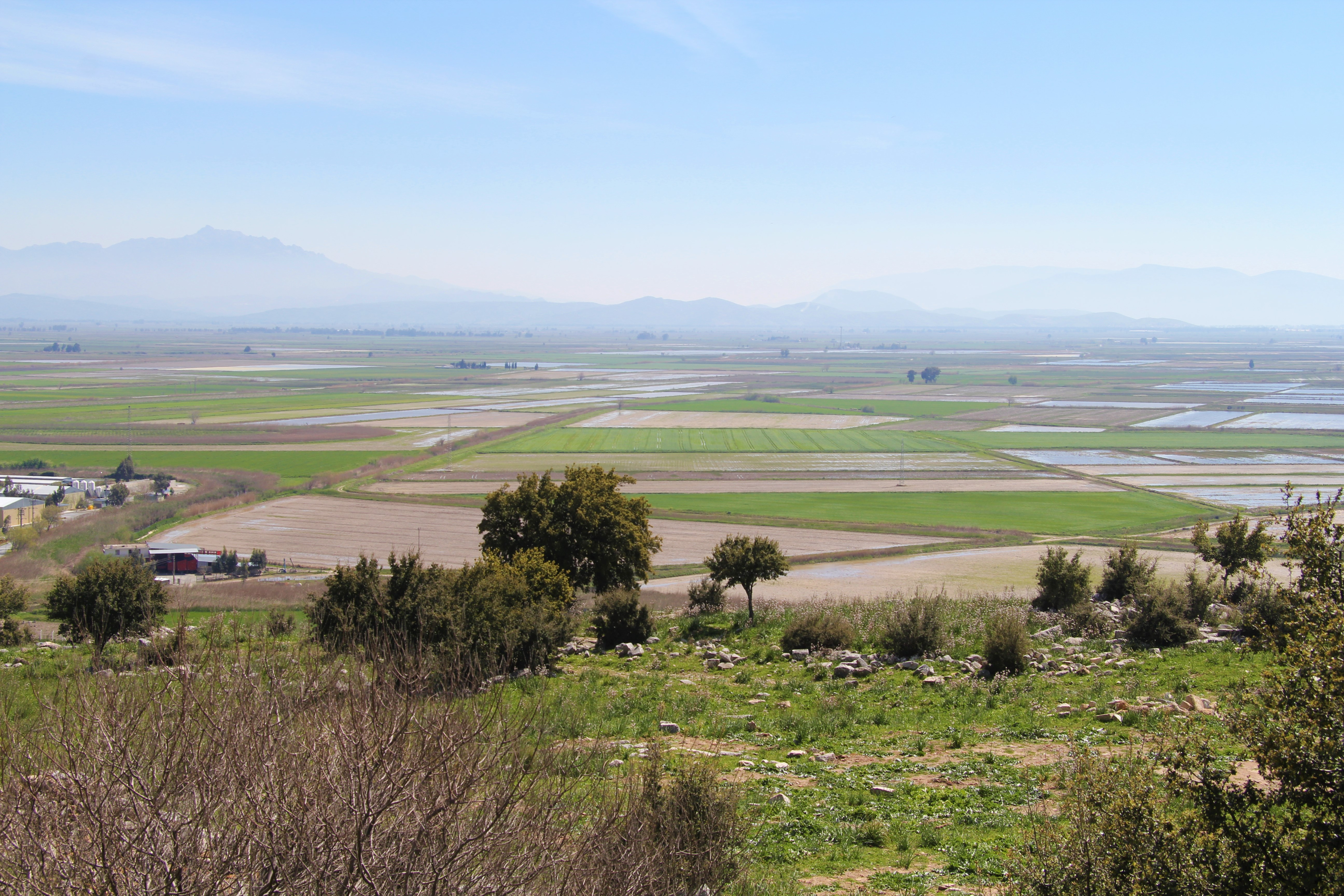
looking toward the Büyük Menderes Delta from the ruins of Priene

Güllübahçe is a neighbourhood of the municipality and district of Söke, Aydın Province, Turkey. Its population is 1,324 (2022). Before the 2013 reorganisation, it was a town (belde).

Sights include the Priene Archeological Site at the western limits of the town and the abandoned Greek village of Gelebeç with its St. Nicholas Church in the Gürsu neighborhood in the northern part of the town.
