= Roman navy =

Navy of ancient Rome

- Classis
- Active: 394 BC–480
- Country: Roman Republic (394 BC–27 BC); Roman Empire (27 BC–395); Western Roman Empire (395–480)
- Role: Naval warfare
- Engagements: First Punic War; Second Punic War; War of Actium

The naval forces of the ancient Roman state (Latin: classis, lit. 'fleet') were instrumental in the Roman conquest of the Mediterranean Basin, but it never enjoyed the prestige of the Roman legions. Throughout their history, the Romans remained a primarily land-based people and relied partially on their more nautically inclined subjects, such as the Greeks and the Egyptians, to build their ships. Because of that, the navy was never completely embraced by the Roman state, and deemed somewhat "un-Roman".

In antiquity, navies and trading fleets did not have the logistical autonomy that modern ships and fleets possess, and unlike modern naval forces, the Roman navy even at its height never existed as an autonomous service but operated as an adjunct to the Roman army.

During the course of the First Punic War, the Roman navy was massively expanded and played a vital role in the Roman victory and the Roman Republic's eventual ascension to hegemony in the Mediterranean Sea. In the course of the first half of the 2nd century BC, Rome went on to destroy Carthage and subdue the Hellenistic kingdoms of the eastern Mediterranean, achieving complete mastery of the inland sea, which they called Mare Nostrum. The Roman fleets were again prominent in the 1st century BC in the wars against the pirates, and in the civil wars that brought down the Republic, whose campaigns ranged across the Mediterranean. In 31 BC, the great naval Battle of Actium ended the civil wars culminating in the final victory of Augustus and the establishment of the Roman Empire.

During the Imperial period, the Mediterranean became largely a peaceful "Roman lake". In the absence of a maritime enemy, the navy was reduced mostly to patrol, anti-piracy and transport duties. By far, the navy's most vital task was to ensure Roman grain imports were shipped and delivered to the capital unimpeded across the Mediterranean. The navy also manned and maintained craft on major frontier rivers such as the Rhine and the Danube for supplying the army and preventing crossings by enemies.

On the fringes of the Empire, in new conquests or, increasingly, in defense against barbarian invasions, the Roman fleets were still engaged in open warfare. The decline of the Empire in the 3rd century took a heavy toll on the navy, which was reduced to a shadow of its former self, both in size and in combat ability. As successive waves of the Migration Period crashed on the land frontiers of the battered Empire, the navy could only play a secondary role. In the early 5th century, the Roman frontiers were breached, and barbarian kingdoms appeared on the shores of the western Mediterranean. One of them, the Vandal Kingdom with its capital at Carthage, raised a navy of its own and raided the shores of the Mediterranean, even sacking Rome, while the diminished Roman fleets were incapable of offering any resistance. The Western Roman Empire collapsed in the late 5th century. The navy of the surviving Eastern Roman Empire is known as the Byzantine navy.

== History ==
=== Early Republic ===
The exact origins of the Roman fleet are obscure. A traditionally agricultural and land-based society, the Romans rarely ventured out to sea, unlike their Etruscan neighbours. There is evidence of Roman warships in the early 4th century BC, such as mention of a warship that carried an embassy to Delphi in 394 BC, but at any rate, the Roman fleet, if it existed, was negligible. The traditional birth date of the Roman navy is set at ca. 311 BC, when, after the conquest of Campania, two new officials, the duumviri navales classis ornandae reficiendaeque causa, were tasked with the maintenance of a fleet. As a result, the Republic acquired its first fleet, consisting of 20 ships, most likely triremes, with each duumvir commanding a squadron of 10 ships. However, the Republic continued to rely mostly on her legions for expansion in Italy; the navy was most likely geared towards combating piracy and lacked experience in naval warfare, being easily defeated in 282 BC by the Tarentines.

This situation continued until the First Punic War: the main task of the Roman fleet was patrolling along the Italian coast and rivers, protecting seaborne trade from piracy. Whenever larger tasks had to be undertaken, such as the naval blockade of a besieged city, the Romans called on the allied Greek cities of southern Italy, the socii navales, to provide ships and crews. It is possible that the supervision of these maritime allies was one of the duties of the four new praetores classici, who were established in 267 BC.

==== First Punic War ====
The first Roman expedition outside mainland Italy was against the island of Sicily in 265 BC. This led to the outbreak of hostilities with Carthage, which would last until 241 BC. At the time, the Punic city was the unchallenged master of the western Mediterranean, possessing a long maritime and naval experience and a large fleet. Although Rome had relied on her legions for the conquest of Italy, operations in Sicily had to be supported by a fleet, and the ships available by Rome's allies were insufficient. Thus in 261 BC, the Roman Senate set out to construct a fleet of 100 quinqueremes and 20 triremes. According to Polybius, the Romans seized a shipwrecked Carthaginian quinquereme, and used it as a blueprint for their own ships. The new fleets were commanded by the annually elected Roman magistrates, but naval expertise was provided by the lower officers, who continued to be provided by the socii, mostly Greeks. This practice was continued until well into the Empire, something also attested by the direct adoption of numerous Greek naval terms.

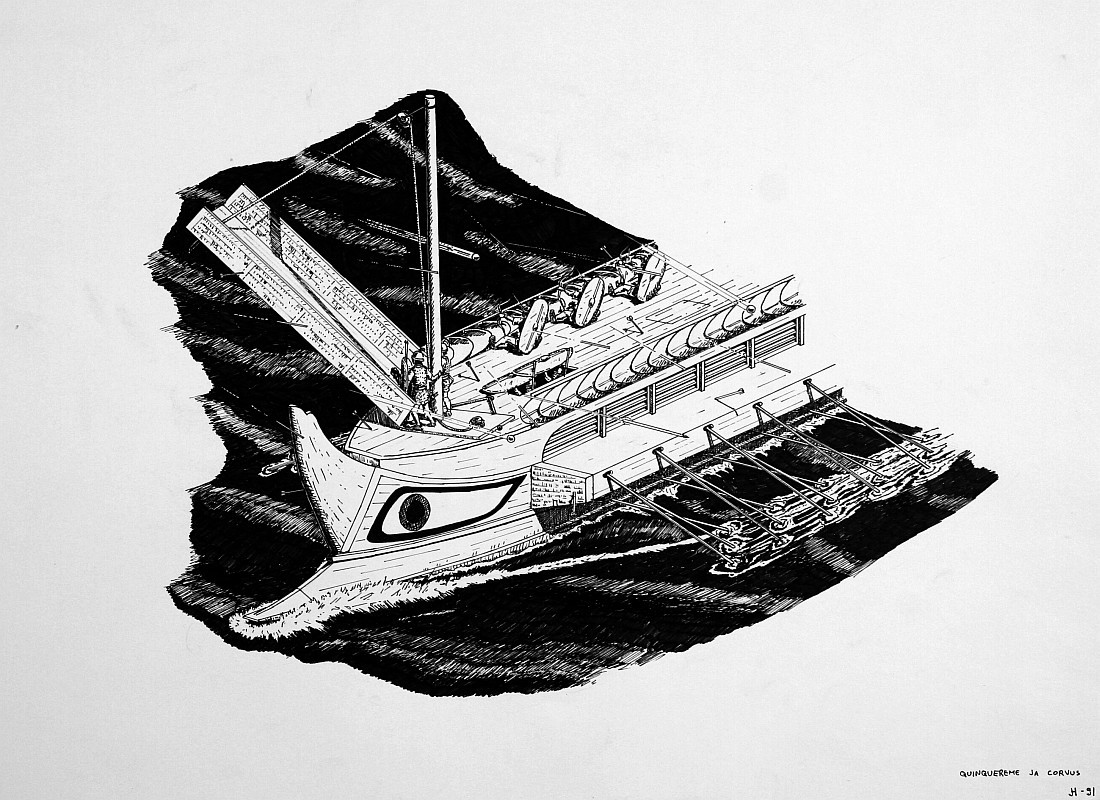
Three-banked ("trireme") Roman quinquereme with the Corvus boarding bridge. The use of the Corvus negated the superior Carthaginian naval expertise, and allowed the Romans to establish their naval superiority in the western Mediterranean.

Despite the massive buildup, the Roman crews remained inferior in naval experience to the Carthaginians, and could not hope to match them in naval tactics, which required great maneuverability and experience. They, therefore, employed a novel weapon that transformed sea warfare to their advantage. They equipped their ships with the corvus, possibly developed earlier by the Syracusans against the Athenians. This was a long plank with a spike for hooking onto enemy ships. Using it as a boarding bridge, marines were able to board an enemy ship, transforming sea combat into a version of land combat, where the Roman legionaries had the upper hand. However, it is believed that the Corvus weight made the ships unstable, and could capsize a ship in rough seas.

Although the first sea engagement of the war, the Battle of the Lipari Islands in 260 BC, was a defeat for Rome, the forces involved were relatively small. Through the use of the Corvus, the fledgling Roman navy under Gaius Duilius won its first major engagement later that year at the Battle of Mylae. During the course of the war, Rome continued to be victorious at sea: victories at Sulci (258 BC) and Tyndaris (257 BC) were followed by the massive Battle of Cape Ecnomus, where the Roman fleet under the consuls Marcus Atilius Regulus and Lucius Manlius inflicted a severe defeat on the Carthaginians. This string of successes allowed Rome to push the war further across the sea to Africa and Carthage itself. Continued Roman success also meant that their navy gained significant experience, although it also suffered a number of catastrophic losses due to storms, while conversely, the Carthaginian navy suffered from attrition.

The Battle of Drepana in 249 BC resulted in the only major Carthaginian sea victory, forcing the Romans to equip a new fleet from donations by private citizens. In the last battle of the war, at Aegates Islands in 241 BC, the Romans under Gaius Lutatius Catulus displayed superior seamanship to the Carthaginians, notably using their rams rather than the now-abandoned Corvus to achieve victory.

==== Illyria and the Second Punic War ====
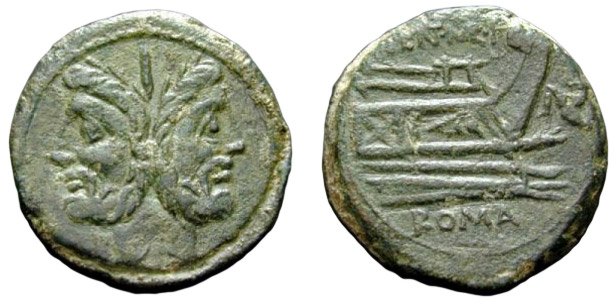
Roman as coin of the second half of the 3rd century BC, featuring the prow of a galley, most likely a quinquereme. Several similar issues are known, illustrating the importance of naval power during that period of Rome's history.

After the Roman victory, the balance of naval power in the Western Mediterranean had shifted from Carthage to Rome. This ensured Carthaginian acquiescence to the conquest of Sardinia and Corsica, and also enabled Rome to deal decisively with the threat posed by the Illyrian pirates in the Adriatic. The Illyrian Wars marked Rome's first involvement with the affairs of the Balkan peninsula. Initially, in 229 BC, a fleet of 200 warships was sent against Queen Teuta, and swiftly expelled the Illyrian garrisons from the Greek coastal cities of modern-day Albania. Ten years later, the Romans sent another expedition in the area against Demetrius of Pharos, who had rebuilt the Illyrian navy and engaged in piracy up into the Aegean. Demetrius was supported by Philip V of Macedon, who had grown anxious at the expansion of Roman power in Illyria. The Romans were again quickly victorious and expanded their Illyrian protectorate, but the beginning of the Second Punic War (218–201 BC) forced them to divert their resources westwards for the next decades.

Due to Rome's command of the seas, Hannibal, Carthage's great general, was forced to eschew a sea-borne invasion, instead choosing to bring the war over land to the Italian peninsula. Unlike the first war, the navy played little role on either side in this war. The only naval encounters occurred in the first years of the war, at Lilybaeum (218 BC) and the Ebro River (217 BC), both resulting Roman victories. Despite an overall numerical parity, for the remainder of the war the Carthaginians did not seriously challenge Roman supremacy. The Roman fleet was hence engaged primarily with raiding the shores of Africa and guarding Italy, a task which included the interception of Carthaginian convoys of supplies and reinforcements for Hannibal's army, as well as keeping an eye on a potential intervention by Carthage's ally, Philip V. The only major action in which the Roman fleet was involved was the siege of Syracuse in 214–212 BC with 130 ships under Marcus Claudius Marcellus. The siege is remembered for the ingenious inventions of Archimedes, such as mirrors that burned ships or the so-called "Claw of Archimedes", which kept the besieging army at bay for two years. A fleet of 160 vessels was assembled to support Scipio Africanus' army in Africa in 202 BC, and, should his expedition fail, evacuate his men. In the event, Scipio achieved a decisive victory at Zama, and the subsequent peace stripped Carthage of its fleet.

==== Operations in the East ====
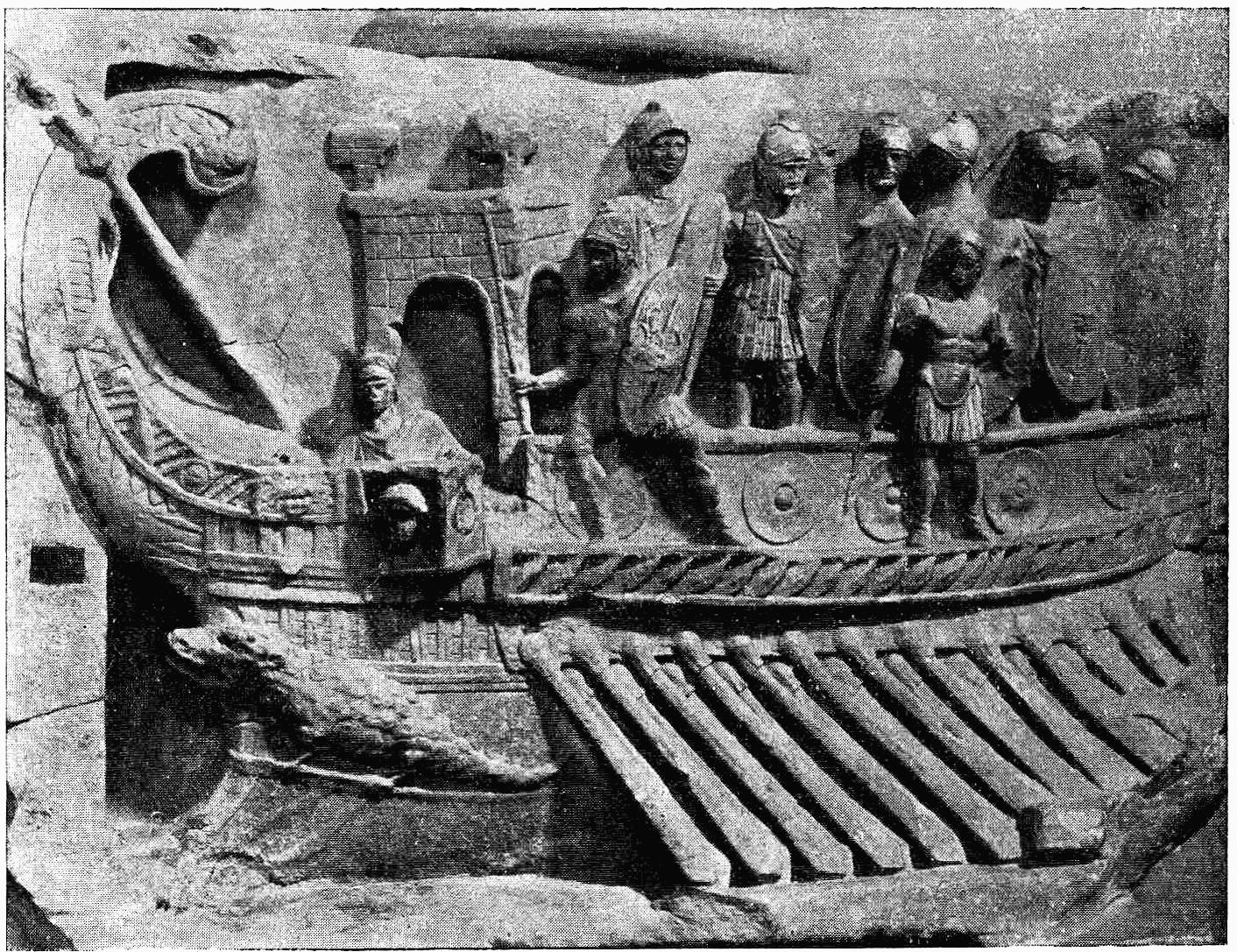
A Roman naval bireme depicted in a relief from the Temple of Fortuna Primigenia in Praeneste (Palastrina), which was built c. 120 BC; exhibited in the Pius-Clementine Museum (Museo Pio-Clementino) in the Vatican Museums.

Rome was now the undisputed master of the Western Mediterranean, and turned her gaze from defeated Carthage to the Hellenistic world. Small Roman forces had already been engaged in the First Macedonian War, when, in 214 BC, a fleet under Marcus Valerius Laevinus had successfully thwarted Philip V from invading Illyria with his newly built fleet. The rest of the war was carried out mostly by Rome's allies, the Aetolian League and later the Kingdom of Pergamon, but a combined Roman–Pergamene fleet of ca. 60 ships patrolled the Aegean until the war's end in 205 BC. In this conflict, Rome, still embroiled in the Punic War, was not interested in expanding her possessions, but rather in thwarting the growth of Philip's power in Greece. The war ended in an effective stalemate, and was renewed in 201 BC, when Philip V invaded Asia Minor. A naval battle off Chios ended in a costly victory for the Pergamene–Rhodian alliance, but the Macedonian fleet lost many warships, including its flagship, a deceres. Soon after, Pergamon and Rhodes appealed to Rome for help, and the Republic was drawn into the Second Macedonian War. In view of the massive Roman naval superiority, the war was fought on land, with the Macedonian fleet, already weakened at Chios, not daring to venture out of its anchorage at Demetrias. After the crushing Roman victory at Cynoscephalae, the terms imposed on Macedon were harsh, and included the complete disbandment of her navy.

Almost immediately following the defeat of Macedon, Rome became embroiled in a war with the Seleucid Empire. This war too was decided mainly on land, although the combined Roman–Rhodian navy also achieved victories over the Seleucids at Myonessus and Eurymedon. These victories, which were invariably concluded with the imposition of peace treaties that prohibited the maintenance of anything but token naval forces, spelled the disappearance of the Hellenistic royal navies, leaving Rome and her allies unchallenged at sea. Coupled with the final destruction of Carthage, and the end of Macedon's independence, by the latter half of the 2nd century BC, Roman control over all of what was later to be dubbed mare nostrum ("our sea") had been established. Subsequently, the Roman navy was drastically reduced, depending on its Socii navales.

=== Late Republic ===
==== Mithridates and the pirate threat ====
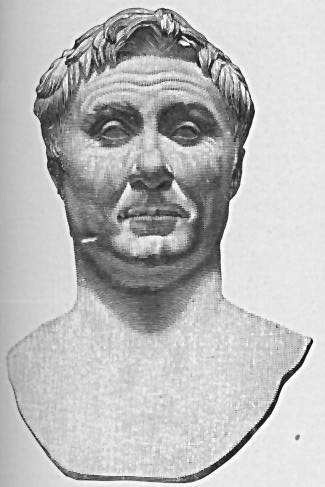
Pompey the Great. His swift and decisive campaign against the pirates re-established Rome's control over the Mediterranean sea lanes.

In the absence of a strong naval presence however, piracy flourished throughout the Mediterranean, especially in Cilicia, but also in Crete and other places, further reinforced by money and warships supplied by King Mithridates VI of Pontus, who hoped to enlist their aid in his wars against Rome. In the First Mithridatic War (89–85 BC), Sulla had to requisition ships wherever he could find them to counter Mithridates' fleet. Despite the makeshift nature of the Roman fleet however, in 86 BC Lucullus defeated the Pontic navy at Tenedos.

Immediately after the end of the war, a permanent force of ca. 100 vessels was established in the Aegean from the contributions of Rome's allied maritime states. Although sufficient to guard against Mithridates, this force was totally inadequate against the pirates, whose power grew rapidly. Over the next decade, the pirates defeated several Roman commanders, and raided unhindered even to the shores of Italy, reaching Rome's harbor, Ostia. According to the account of Plutarch, "the ships of the pirates numbered more than a thousand, and the cities captured by them four hundred." Their activity posed a growing threat for the Roman economy, and a challenge to Roman power: several prominent Romans, including two praetors with their retinue and the young Julius Caesar, were captured and held for ransom. Perhaps most important of all, the pirates disrupted Rome's vital lifeline, namely the massive shipments of grain and other produce from Africa and Egypt that were needed to sustain the city's population.

The resulting grain shortages were a major political issue, and popular discontent threatened to become explosive. In 74 BC, with the outbreak of the Third Mithridatic War, Marcus Antonius (the father of Mark Antony) was appointed praetor with extraordinary imperium against the pirate threat, but signally failed in his task: he was defeated off Crete in 72 BC, and died shortly after. Finally, in 67 BC the Lex Gabinia was passed in the Plebeian Council, vesting Pompey with unprecedented powers and authorizing him to move against them. In a massive and concerted campaign, Pompey cleared the seas of the pirates in only three months. Afterwards, the fleet was reduced again to policing duties against intermittent piracy.

==== Caesar and the Civil Wars ====
In 56 BC, for the first time a Roman fleet engaged in battle outside the Mediterranean. This occurred during Julius Caesar's Gallic Wars, when the maritime tribe of the Veneti rebelled against Rome. Against the Veneti, the Romans were at a disadvantage, since they did not know the coast, and were inexperienced in fighting in the open sea with its tides and currents. Furthermore, the Veneti ships were superior to the light Roman galleys. They were built of oak and had no oars, being thus more resistant to ramming. In addition, their greater height gave them an advantage in both missile exchanges and boarding actions. In the event, when the two fleets encountered each other in Quiberon Bay, Caesar's navy, under the command of D. Brutus, resorted to the use of hooks on long poles, which cut the halyards supporting the Veneti sails. Immobile, the Veneti ships were easy prey for the legionaries who boarded them, and fleeing Veneti ships were taken when they became becalmed by a sudden lack of winds. Having thus established his control of the English Channel, in the next years Caesar used this newly built fleet to carry out two invasions of Britain.

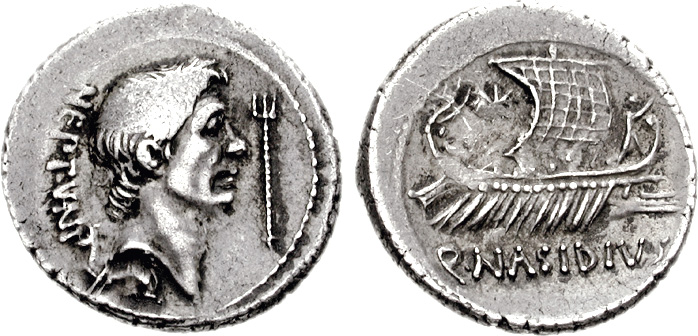
Silver denarius struck by Sextus Pompeius in 44–43 BC, featuring a bust of Pompey the Great and a Roman warship.

The last major campaigns of the Roman navy in the Mediterranean until the late 3rd century AD would be in the civil wars that ended the Republic. In the East, the Republican faction quickly established its control, and Rhodes, the last independent maritime power in the Aegean, was subdued by Gaius Cassius Longinus in 43 BC, after its fleet was defeated off Kos. In the West, against the triumvirs stood Sextus Pompeius, who had been given command of the Italian fleet by the Senate in 43 BC. He took control of Sicily and made it his base, blockading Italy and stopping the politically crucial supply of grain from Africa to Rome. After suffering a defeat from Sextus in 42 BC, Octavian initiated massive naval armaments, aided by his closest associate, Marcus Agrippa: ships were built at Ravenna and Ostia, the new artificial harbor of Portus Julius built at Cumae, and soldiers and rowers levied, including over 20,000 manumitted slaves. Finally, Octavian and Agrippa defeated Sextus in the Battle of Naulochus in 36 BC, putting an end to all Pompeian resistance.

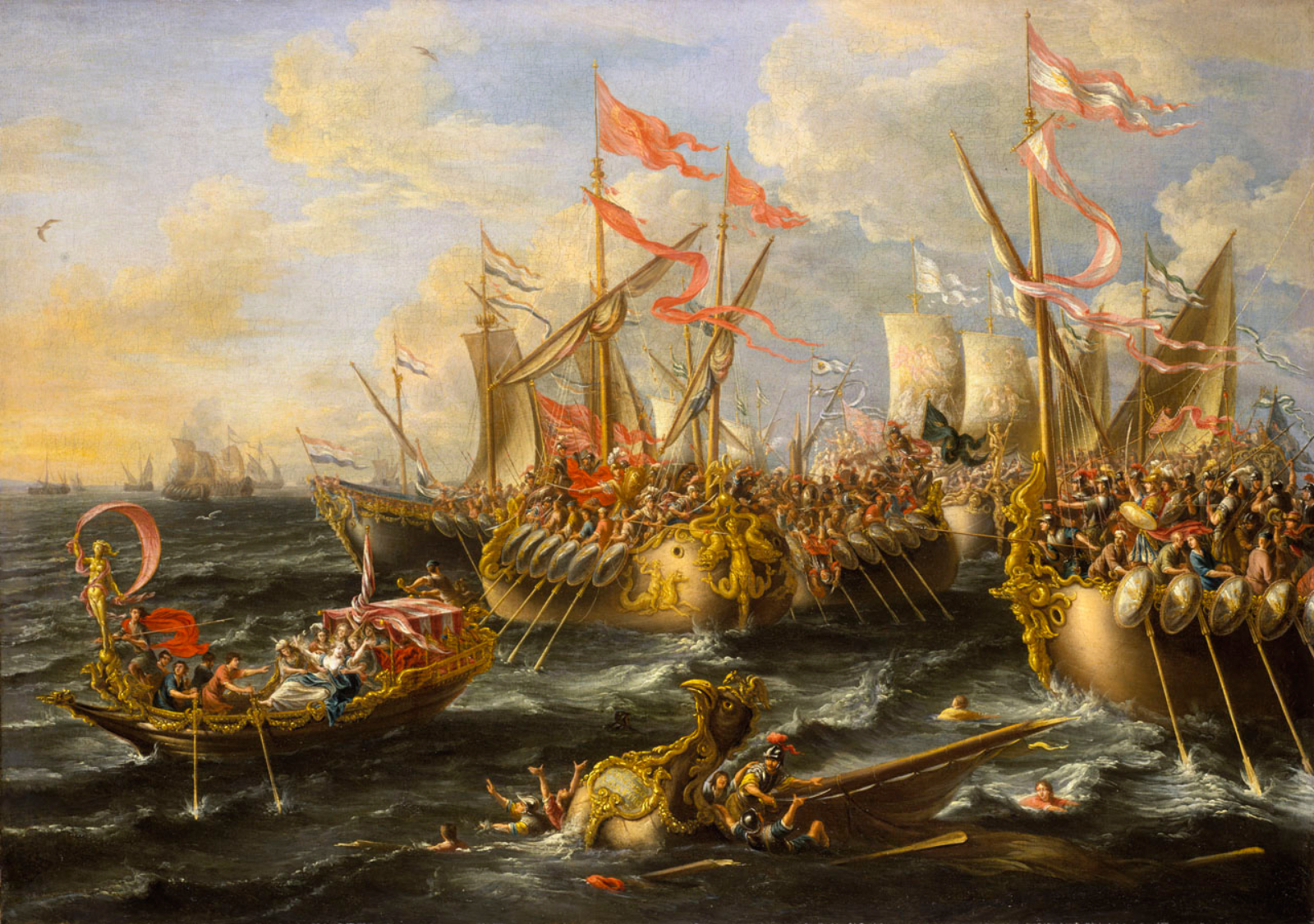
The Battle of Actium, by Laureys a Castro, painted 1672.

Octavian's power was further enhanced after his victory against the combined fleets of Mark Antony and Cleopatra, Queen of Egypt, in the Battle of Actium in 31 BC, where Antony had assembled 500 ships against Octavian's 400 ships. This last naval battle of the Roman Republic definitively established Octavian as the sole ruler over Rome and the Mediterranean world. In the aftermath of his victory, he formalized the Fleet's structure, establishing several key harbors in the Mediterranean (see below). The now fully professional navy had its main duties consist of protecting against piracy, escorting troops and patrolling the river frontiers of Europe. It remained however engaged in active warfare in the periphery of the Empire.

=== Principate ===
==== Operations under Augustus ====
Under Augustus and after the conquest of Egypt there were increasing demands from the Roman economy to extend the trade lanes to India. The Arabian control of all sea routes to India was an obstacle. One of the first naval operations under princeps Augustus was therefore the preparation for a campaign on the Arabian Peninsula. Aelius Gallus, the prefect of Egypt ordered the construction of 130 transports and subsequently carried 10,000 soldiers to Arabia. But the following march through the desert towards Yemen failed and the plans for control of the Arabian Peninsula had to be abandoned.

At the other end of the Empire, in Germania, the navy played an important role in the supply and transport of the legions. In 15 BC an independent fleet was installed at Lake Constance. Later, the generals Drusus and Tiberius used the Navy extensively, when they tried to extend the Roman frontier to the Elbe. In 12 BC Drusus ordered the construction of a fleet of 1,000 ships and sailed them along the Rhine into the North Sea. The Frisii and Chauci had nothing to oppose the superior numbers, tactics and technology of the Romans. When these entered the river mouths of Weser and Ems, the local tribes had to surrender.

In 5 BC the Roman knowledge concerning the North and Baltic Sea was fairly extended during a campaign by Tiberius, reaching as far as the Elbe: Pliny the Elder describes how Roman naval formations came past Heligoland and set sail to the north-eastern coast of Denmark, and Augustus himself boasts in his Res Gestae: "My fleet sailed from the mouth of the Rhine eastward as far as the lands of the Cimbri to which, up to that time, no Roman had ever penetrated either by land or by sea...". The multiple naval operations north of Germania had to be abandoned after the battle of the Teutoburg Forest in the year 9 AD.

==== Julio-Claudian dynasty ====
In the years 15 and 16, Germanicus carried out several fleet operations along the rivers Rhine and Ems, without permanent results due to grim Germanic resistance and a disastrous storm. By 28, the Romans lost further control of the Rhine mouth in a succession of Frisian insurgencies. From 43 to 85, the Roman navy played an important role in the Roman conquest of Britain. The classis Germanica rendered outstanding services in multitudinous landing operations. In 46, a naval expedition made a push deep into the Black Sea region and even travelled on the Tanais. In 47 a revolt by the Chauci, who took to piratical activities along the Gallic coast, was subdued by Gnaeus Domitius Corbulo. By 57 an expeditionary corps reached Chersonesos (see Charax, Crimea).

It seems that under Nero, the navy obtained strategically important positions for trading with India; but there was no known fleet in the Red Sea. Possibly, parts of the Alexandrian fleet were operating as escorts for the Indian trade. In the Jewish revolt, from 66 to 70, the Romans were forced to fight Jewish ships, operating from a harbour in the area of modern Tel Aviv, on Israel's Mediterranean coast. In the meantime several flotilla engagements on the Sea of Galilee took place.

In 68, as his reign became increasingly insecure, Nero raised legio I Adiutrix from sailors of the praetorian fleets. After Nero's overthrow, in 69, the "Year of the four emperors", the praetorian fleets supported Emperor Otho against the usurper Vitellius, and after his eventual victory, Vespasian formed another legion, legio II Adiutrix, from their ranks. Only in Pontus did Anicetus, the commander of the Classis Pontica, support Vitellius. He burned the fleet, and sought refuge with the Iberian tribes, engaging in piracy. After a new fleet was built, this revolt was subdued.

==== Flavian, Antonine and Severan dynasties ====
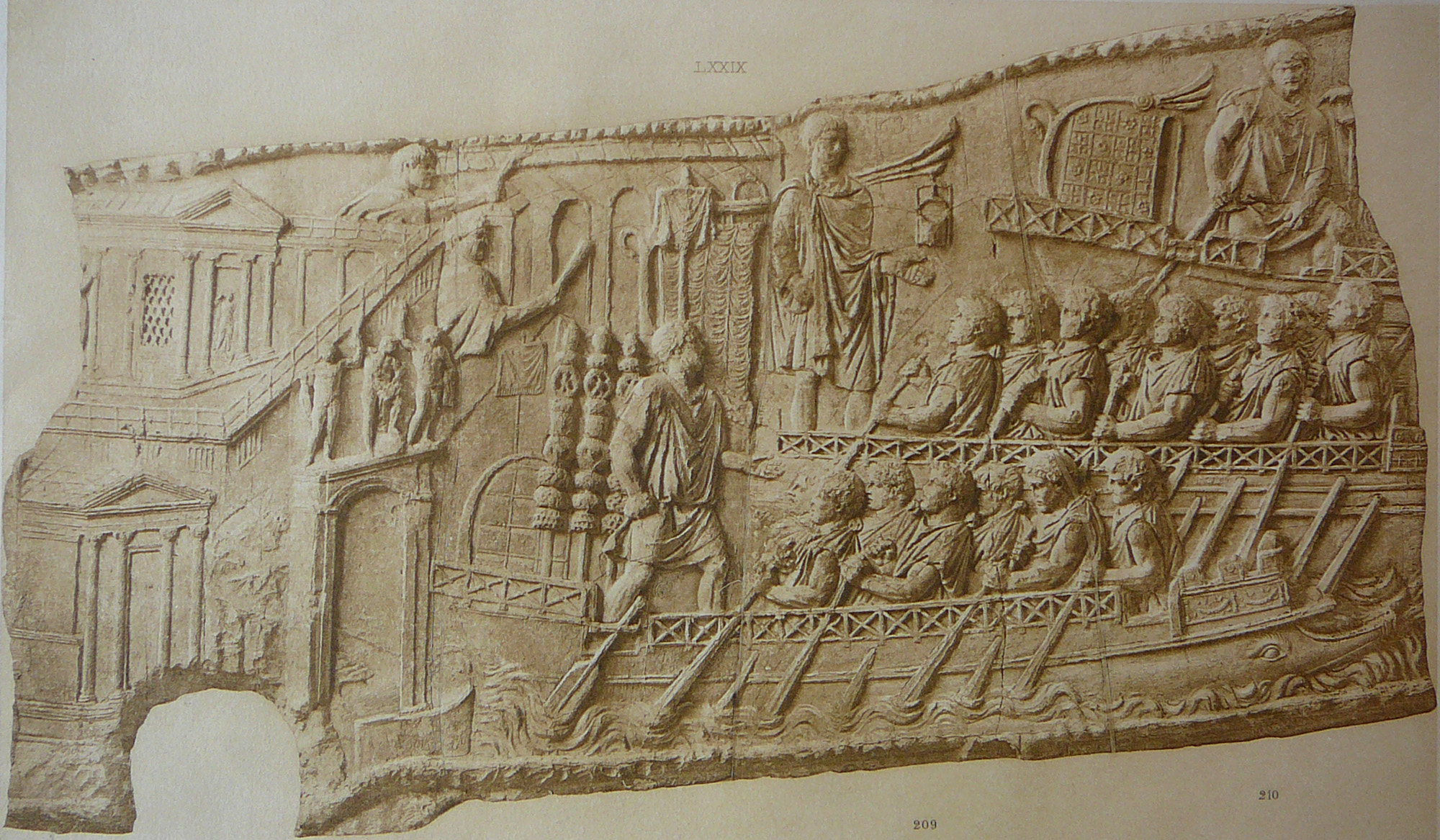
Two-banked lburnians of the Danube fleets during Trajan's Dacian Wars. Casts of reliefs from Trajan's Column, Rome.

During the Batavian rebellion of Gaius Julius Civilis (69–70), the rebels got hold of a squadron of the Rhine fleet by treachery, and the conflict featured frequent use of the Roman Rhine flotilla. In the last phase of the war, the British fleet and legio XIV were brought in from Britain to attack the Batavian coast, but the Cananefates, allies of the Batavians, were able to destroy or capture a large part of the fleet. In the meantime, the new Roman commander, Quintus Petillius Cerialis, advanced north and constructed a new fleet. Civilis attempted only a short encounter with his own fleet, but could not hinder the superior Roman force from landing and ravaging the island of the Batavians, leading to the negotiation of a peace soon after.

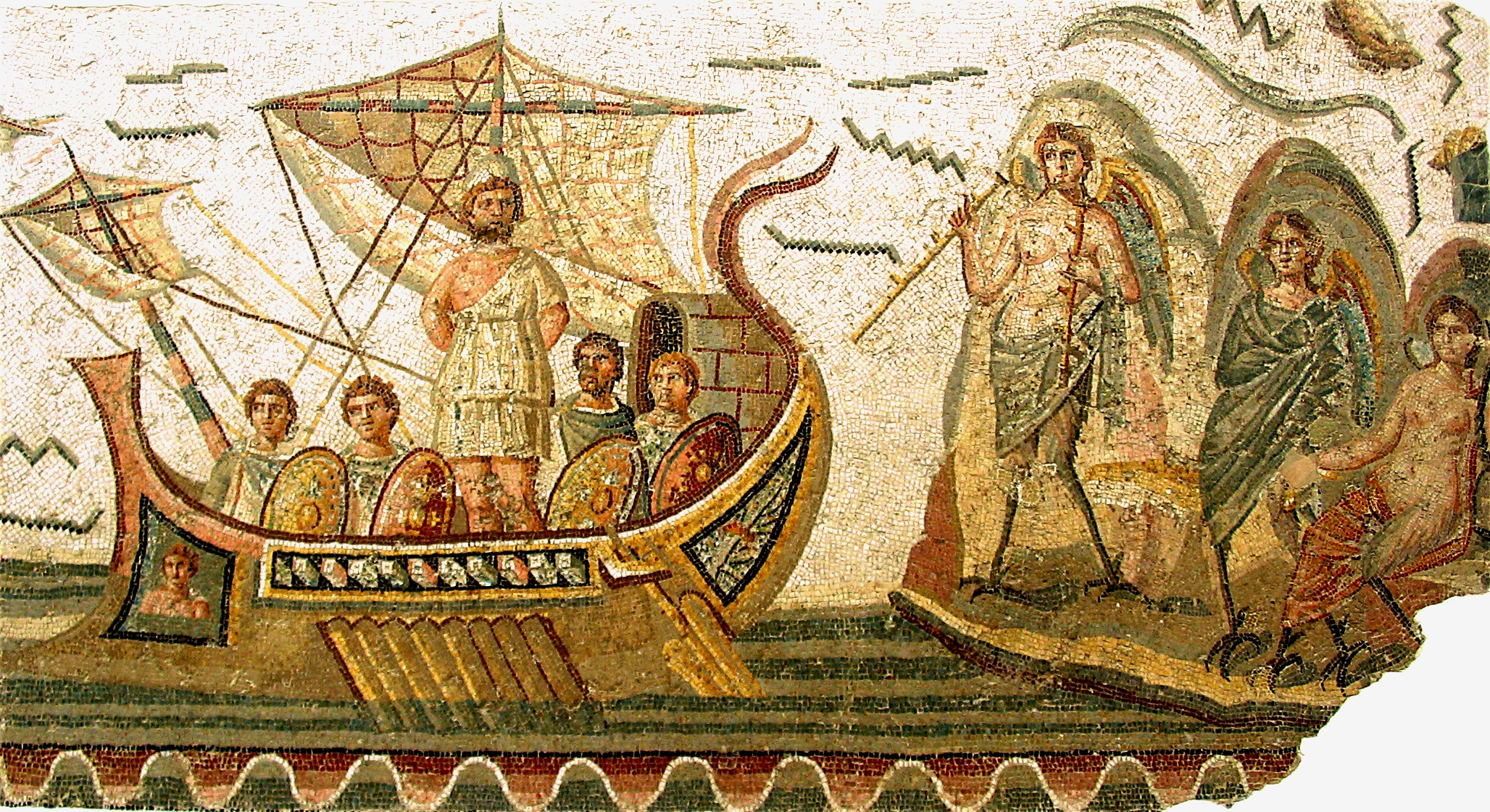
Mosaic of a Roman galley, Bardo Museum, Tunisia, 2nd century AD.

In the years 82 to 85, the Romans under Gnaeus Julius Agricola launched a campaign against the Caledonians in modern Scotland. In this context the Roman navy significantly escalated activities on the eastern Scottish coast. Simultaneously multiple expeditions and reconnaissance trips were launched. During these the Romans would capture the Orkney Islands (Orcades) for a short period of time and obtained information about the Shetland Islands. There is some speculation about a Roman landing in Ireland, based on Tacitus reports about Agricola contemplating the island's conquest, but no conclusive evidence to support this theory has been found.

Under the Five Good Emperors the navy operated mainly on the rivers; so it played an important role during Trajan's conquest of Dacia and temporarily an independent fleet for the Euphrates and Tigris rivers was founded. Also during the wars against the Marcomanni confederation under Marcus Aurelius several combats took place on the Danube and the Tisza.

Under the aegis of the Severan dynasty, the only known military operations of the navy were carried out under Septimius Severus, using naval assistance on his campaigns along the Euphrates and Tigris, as well as in Scotland. Thereby Roman ships reached inter alia the Persian Gulf and the top of the British Isles.

==== 3rd century crisis ====
As the 3rd century dawned, the Roman Empire was at its peak. In the Mediterranean, peace had reigned for over two centuries, as piracy had been wiped out and no outside naval threats occurred. As a result, complacency had set in: naval tactics and technology were neglected, and the Roman naval system had become moribund. After 230 however and for fifty years, the situation changed dramatically. The so-called "Crisis of the Third Century" ushered a period of internal turmoil, and the same period saw a renewed series of seaborne assaults, which the imperial fleets proved unable to stem. In the West, Picts and Irish ships raided Britain, while the Saxons raided the North Sea, forcing the Romans to abandon Frisia. In the East, the Goths and other tribes from modern Ukraine raided in great numbers over the Black Sea. These invasions began during the rule of Trebonianus Gallus, when for the first time Germanic tribes built up their own powerful fleet in the Black Sea. Via two surprise attacks (256) on Roman naval bases in the Caucasus and near the Danube, numerous ships fell into the hands of the Germans, whereupon the raids were extended as far as the Aegean Sea; Byzantium, Athens, Sparta and other towns were plundered and the responsible provincial fleets were heavily debilitated. It was not until the attackers made a tactical error, that their onrush could be stopped.

In 267–270 another, much fiercer series of attacks took place. A fleet composed of Heruli and other tribes raided the coasts of Thrace and Pontus. Defeated off Byzantium by general Venerianus, the barbarians fled into the Aegean, and ravaged many islands and coastal cities, including Athens and Corinth. As they retreated northwards over land, they were defeated by Emperor Gallienus at Nestos. However, this was merely the prelude to an even larger invasion that was launched in 268/269: several tribes banded together (the Historia Augusta mentions Scythians, Greuthungi, Tervingi, Gepids, Peucini, Celts and Heruli) and allegedly 2,000 ships and 325,000 men strong, raided the Thracian shore, attacked Byzantium and continued raiding the Aegean as far as Crete, while the main force approached Thessalonica. Emperor Claudius II however was able to defeat them at the Battle of Naissus, ending the Gothic threat for the time being.

Barbarian raids also increased along the Rhine frontier and in the North Sea. Eutropius mentions that during the 280s, the sea along the coasts of the provinces of Belgica and Armorica was "infested with Franks and Saxons". To counter them, Maximian appointed Carausius as commander of the Classis Britannica. However, Carausius rose up in late 286 and seceded from the Empire with Britannia and parts of the northern Gallic coast. With a single blow Roman control of the channel and the North Sea was lost, and the Caesar Maximinus was forced to create a completely new Northern Fleet, but in lack of training it was almost immediately destroyed in a storm. Only in 293, under Caesar Constantius Chlorus did Rome regain the Gallic coast. A new fleet was constructed in order to cross the Channel, and in 296, with a concentric attack on Londinium the insurgent province was retaken.

=== Late antiquity ===
By the end of the 3rd century, the Roman navy had declined dramatically. Although Emperor Diocletian is held to have strengthened the navy, and increased its manpower from 46,000 to 64,000 men, the old standing fleets had all but vanished, and in the civil wars that ended the Tetrarchy, the opposing sides had to mobilize the resources and commandeered the ships of the Eastern Mediterranean port cities. These conflicts thus brought about a renewal of naval activity, culminating in the Battle of the Hellespont in 324 between the forces of Constantine I under Caesar Crispus and the fleet of Licinius, which was the only major naval confrontation of the 4th century. Vegetius, writing at the end of the 4th century, testifies to the disappearance of the old praetorian fleets in Italy, but comments on the continued activity of the Danube fleet. In the 5th century, only the eastern half of the Empire could field an effective fleet, as it could draw upon the maritime resources of Greece and the Levant. Although the Notitia Dignitatum still mentions several naval units for the Western Empire, these were apparently too depleted to be able to carry out much more than patrol duties. At any rate, the rise of the naval power of the Vandal Kingdom under Geiseric in North Africa, and its raids in the Western Mediterranean, were practically uncontested. Although there is some evidence of West Roman naval activity in the first half of the 5th century, this is mostly confined to troop transports and minor landing operations. The historian Priscus and Sidonius Apollinaris affirm in their writings that by the mid-5th century, the Western Empire essentially lacked a war navy. Matters became even worse after the disastrous failure of the fleets mobilized against the Vandals in 460 and 468, under the emperors Majorian and Anthemius.

For the West, there would be no recovery, as the last Western Emperor, Romulus Augustulus, was deposed in 476. In the East however, the classical naval tradition survived, and in the 6th century, a standing navy was reformed. The East Roman (Byzantine) navy would remain a formidable force in the Mediterranean until the 11th century.

== Organization ==
=== Crews ===
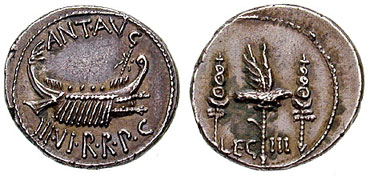
Roman warship on a denarius of Mark Antony

The bulk of a galley's crew was formed by the rowers, the remiges (sing. remex) or eretai (sing. eretēs) in Greek. Despite popular perceptions, the Roman fleet, and ancient fleets in general, relied throughout their existence on rowers of free status, and not on galley slaves. Slaves were employed only in times of pressing manpower demands or extreme emergency, and even then, they were freed first. In Imperial times, non-citizen freeborn provincials (peregrini), chiefly from nations with a maritime background such as Greeks, Phoenicians, Syrians and Egyptians, formed the bulk of the fleets' crews.

During the early Principate, a ship's crew, regardless of its size, was organized as a centuria. Crewmen could sign on as marines, rowers/seamen, craftsmen and various other jobs, though all personnel serving in the imperial fleet were classed as milites ("soldiers"), regardless of their function; only when differentiation with the army was required were the adjectives classiarius or classicus added. Along with several other instances of prevalence of army terminology, this testifies to the lower social status of naval personnel, considered inferior to the auxiliaries and the legionaries. Emperor Claudius first gave legal privileges to the navy's crewmen, enabling them to receive Roman citizenship after their period of service. This period was initially set at a minimum of 26 years (one year more than the legions), and was later expanded to 28. Upon honorable discharge (honesta missio), the sailors received a sizable cash payment as well.

As in the army, the ship's centuria was headed by a centurion with an optio as his deputy, while a beneficiarius supervised a small administrative staff. Among the crew were also a number of principales (junior officers) and immunes (specialists exempt from certain duties). Some of these positions, mostly administrative, were identical to those of the army auxiliaries, while some (mostly of Greek provenance) were peculiar to the fleet. An inscription from the island of Cos, dated to the First Mithridatic War, provides us with a list of a ship's officers, the nautae: the gubernator (kybernētēs in Greek) was the helmsman or pilot, the celeusta (keleustēs in Greek) supervised the rowers, a proreta (prōreus in Greek) was the look-out stationed at the bow, a pentacontarchos was apparently a junior officer, and an iatros (Lat. medicus), the ship's doctor.

Each ship was commanded by a trierarchus, whose exact relationship with the ship's centurion is unclear. Squadrons, most likely of ten ships each, were put under a nauarchus, who often appears to have risen from the ranks of the trierarchi. The post of nauarchus archigubernes or nauarchus princeps appeared later in the Imperial period, and functioned either as a commander of several squadrons or as an executive officer under a civilian admiral, equivalent to the legionary primus pilus. All these were professional officers, usually peregrini, who had a status equal to an auxiliary centurion (and were thus increasingly called centuriones [classiarii] after ca. 70 AD). Until the reign of Antoninus Pius, their careers were restricted to the fleet. Only in the 3rd century were these officers equated to the legionary centurions in status and pay, and could henceforth be transferred to a similar position in the legions.

Merchant vessels were commanded by the magister navis. If privately owned, the owner was called exercitor navis. The modern term of "master" to designate a captain of a merchant vessel derives from the magister navis.

=== High command ===
During the Republic, command of a fleet was given to a serving magistrate or promagistrate, usually of consular or praetorian rank. In the Punic Wars for instance, one consul would usually command the fleet, and another the army. In the subsequent wars in the Eastern Mediterranean, praetors would assume the command of the fleet. However, since these men were political appointees, the actual handling of the fleets and of separate squadrons was entrusted to their more experienced legates and subordinates. It was therefore during the Punic Wars that the separate position of praefectus classis ("fleet prefect") first appeared.

Initially subordinate to the magistrate in command, after the fleet's reorganization by Augustus, the praefectus classis became a procuratorial position in charge of each of the permanent fleets. These posts were initially filled either from among the equestrian class, or, especially under Claudius, from the Emperor's freedmen, thus securing imperial control over the fleets. From the period of the Flavian emperors, the status of the praefectura was raised, and only equestrians with military experience who had gone through the militia equestri were appointed. Nevertheless, the prefects remained largely political appointees, and despite their military experience, usually in command of army auxiliary units, their knowledge of naval matters was minimal, forcing them to rely on their professional subordinates. The difference in importance of the fleets they commanded was also reflected by the rank and the corresponding pay of the commanders. The prefects of the two praetorian fleets were ranked procuratores ducenarii, meaning they earned 200,000 sesterces annually, the prefects of the Classis Germanica, the Classis Britannica and later the Classis Pontica were centenarii (i.e. earning 100,000 sesterces), while the other fleet prefects were sexagenarii (i.e. they received 60,000 sesterces).

=== Types of ships ===
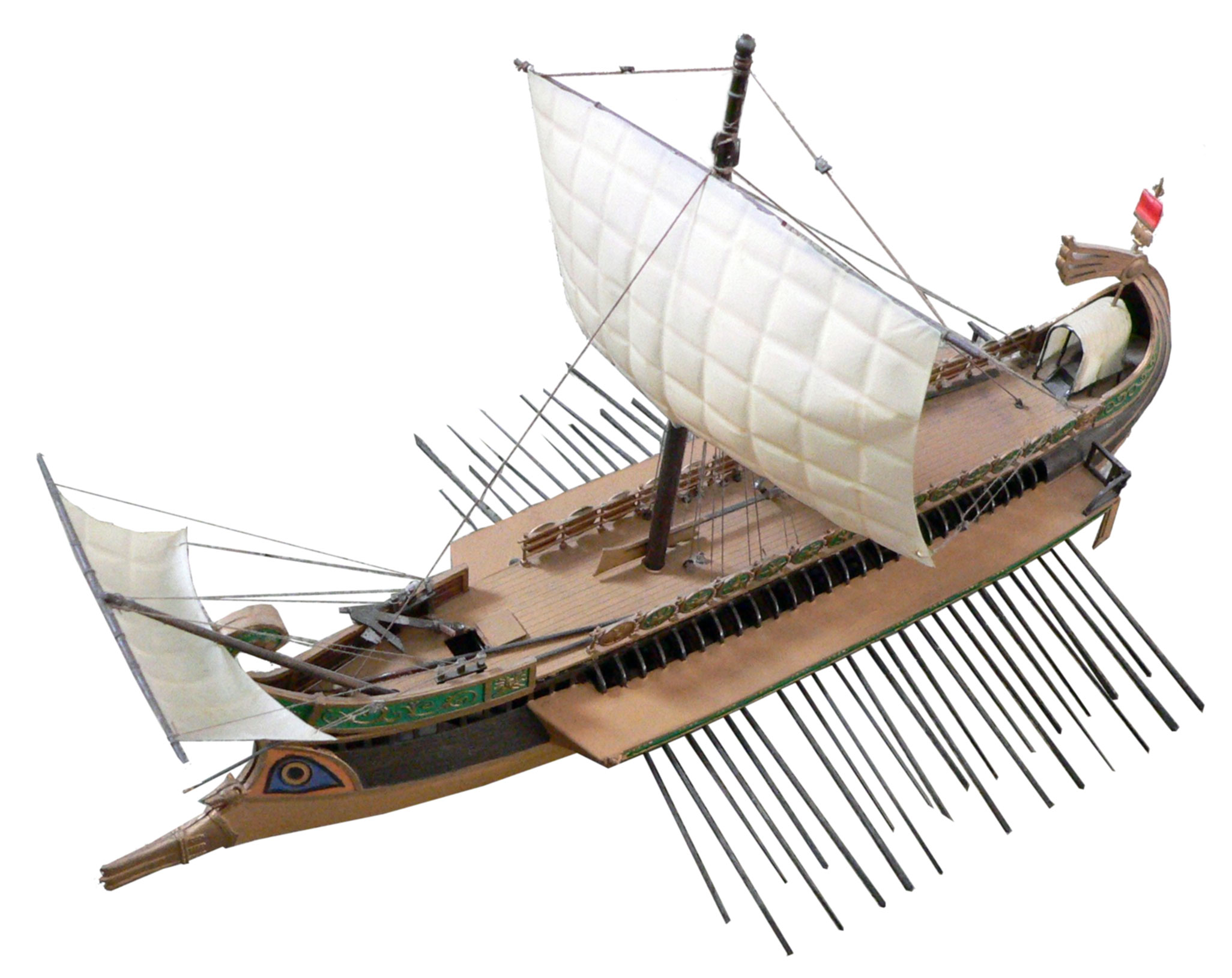
Model of a Roman bireme

The generic Roman term for an oar-driven galley warship was "long ship" (Latin: navis longa, Greek: naus makra), as opposed to the sail-driven navis oneraria (from onus, oneris: burden), a merchant vessel, or the minor craft (navigia minora) like the scapha.

The navy consisted of a wide variety of different classes of warships, from heavy polyremes to light raiding and scouting vessels. Unlike the rich Hellenistic Successor kingdoms in the East however, the Romans did not rely on heavy warships, with quinqueremes (Gk. pentērēs), and to a lesser extent quadriremes (Gk. tetrērēs) and triremes (Gk. triērēs) providing the mainstay of the Roman fleets from the Punic Wars to the end of the Civil Wars. The heaviest vessel mentioned in Roman fleets during this period was the hexareme, of which a few were used as flagships. Lighter vessels such as the liburnians and the hemiolia, both swift types invented by pirates, were also adopted as scouts and light transport vessels.

During the final confrontation between Octavian and Mark Antony, Octavian's fleet was composed of quinqueremes, together with some "sixes" and many triremes and liburnians, while Antony, who had the resources of Ptolemaic Egypt to draw upon, fielded a fleet also mostly composed of quinqueremes, but with a sizeable complement of heavier warships, ranging from "sixes" to "tens" (Gk. dekērēs). Later historical tradition made much of the prevalence of lighter and swifter vessels in Octavian's fleet, with Vegetius even explicitly ascribing Octavian's victory to the liburnians.

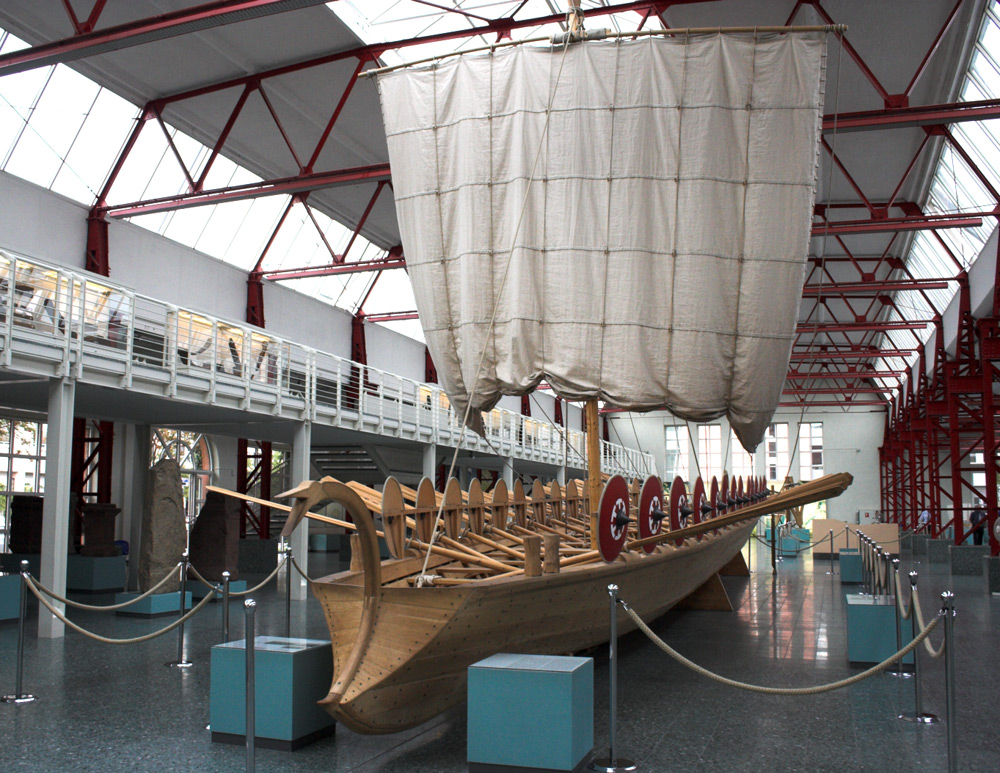
Reconstruction of a late Roman navis lusoria at Mainz

This prominence of lighter craft in the historical narrative is perhaps best explained in light of subsequent developments. After Actium, the operational landscape had changed: for the remainder of the Principate, no opponent existed to challenge Roman naval hegemony, and no massed naval confrontation was likely. The tasks at hand for the Roman navy were now the policing of the Mediterranean waterways and the border rivers, suppression of piracy, and escort duties for the grain shipments to Rome and for imperial army expeditions. Lighter ships were far better suited to these tasks, and after the reorganization of the fleet following Actium, the largest ship kept in service was a hexareme, the flagship of the Classis Misenensis. The bulk of the fleets was composed of the lighter triremes and liburnians (Latin: liburna, Greek: libyrnis), with the latter apparently providing the majority of the provincial fleets. In time, the term "liburnian" came to mean "warship" in a generic sense.

Roman ships were commonly named after gods (Mars, Iuppiter, Minerva, Isis), mythological heroes (Hercules), geographical maritime features such as Rhenus or Oceanus, concepts such as Harmony, Peace, Loyalty, Victory (Concordia, Pax, Fides, Victoria) or after important events (Dacicus for the Trajan's Dacian Wars or Salamina for the Battle of Salamis). They were distinguished by their figurehead (insigne or parasemum), and, during the Civil Wars at least, by the paint schemes on their turrets, which varied according to each fleet.

=== Armament and tactics ===
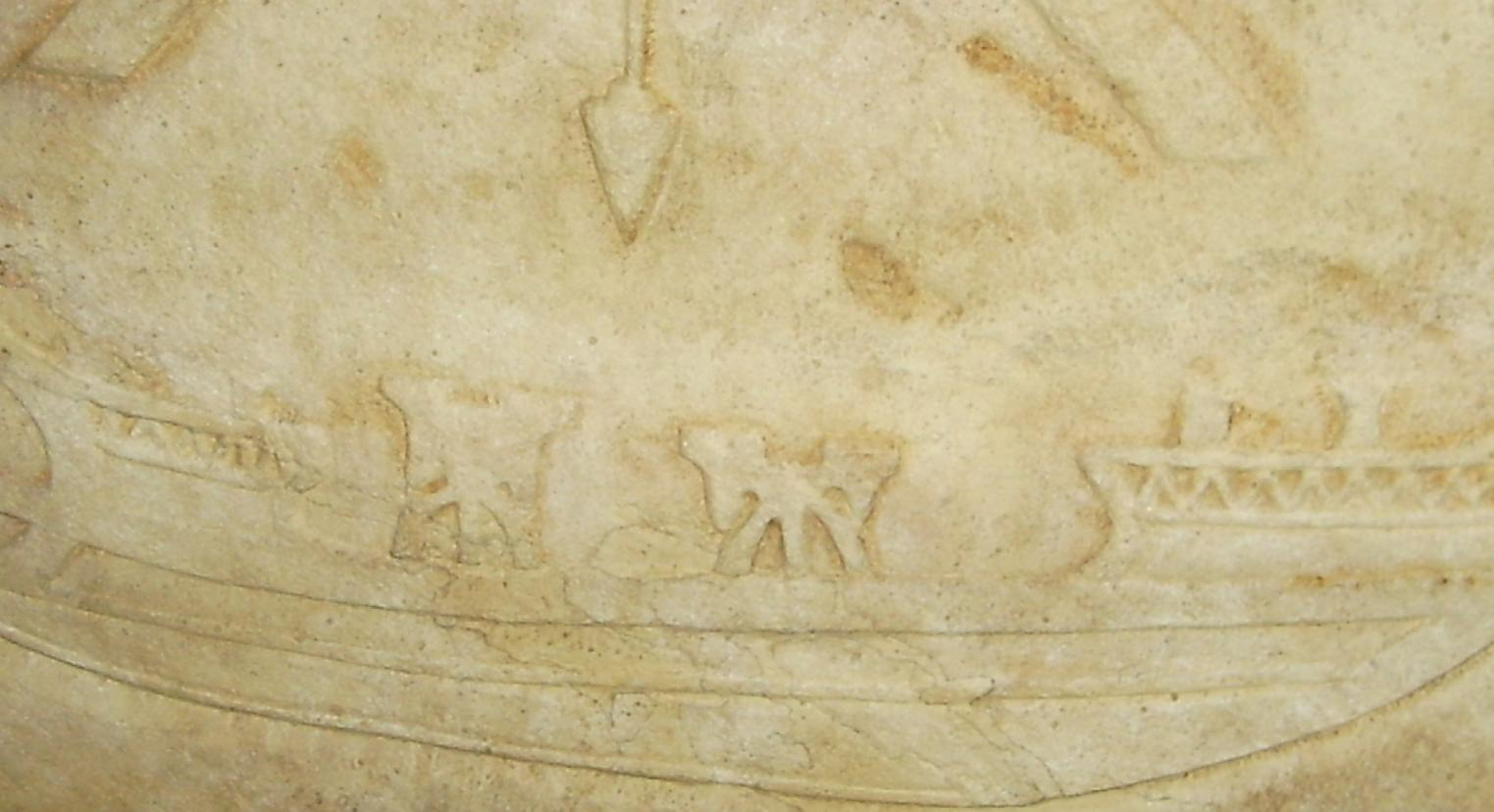
Ballistae on a Roman ship

In classical antiquity, a ship's main weapon was the ram (rostra, hence the name navis rostrata for a warship), which was used to sink or immobilize an enemy ship by holing its hull. Its use, however, required a skilled and experienced crew and a fast and agile ship like a trireme or quinquereme. In the Hellenistic period, the larger navies came instead to rely on greater vessels. This had several advantages: the heavier and sturdier construction lessened the effects of ramming, and the greater space and stability of the vessels allowed the transport not only of more marines, but also the placement of deck-mounted ballistae and catapults.

Although the ram continued to be a standard feature of all warships and ramming the standard mode of attack, these developments transformed the role of a warship: from the old "manned missile", designed to sink enemy ships, they became mobile artillery platforms, which engaged in missile exchange and boarding actions. The Romans in particular, being initially inexperienced at sea combat, relied upon boarding actions through the use of the Corvus. Although it brought them some decisive victories, it was discontinued because it tended to unbalance the quinqueremes in high seas; two Roman fleets are recorded to have been lost during storms in the First Punic War.

During the Civil Wars, a number of technical innovations, which are attributed to Agrippa, took place: the harpax, a catapult-fired grappling hook, which was used to clamp onto an enemy ship, reel it in and board it, in a much more efficient way than with the old corvus, and the use of collapsible fighting towers placed one apiece bow and stern, which were used to provide the boarders with supporting fire.

=== Fleets ===
==== Principate period ====
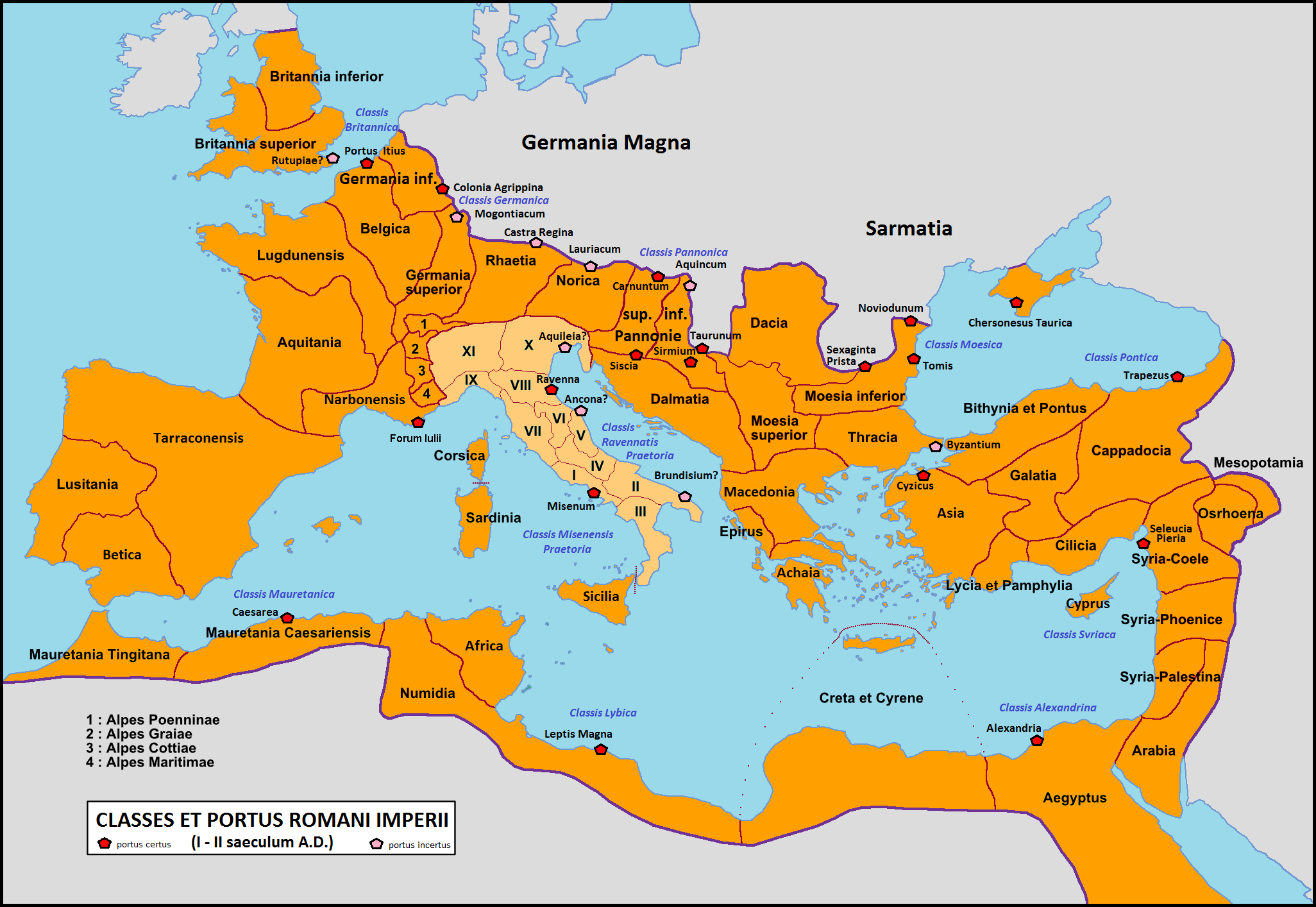
Map of the Roman fleets and major naval bases during the Principate

After the end of the civil wars, Augustus reduced and reorganized the Roman armed forces, including the navy. A large part of the fleet of Mark Antony was burned, and the rest was withdrawn to a new base at Forum Iulii (modern Fréjus), which remained operative until the reign of Claudius. However, the bulk of the fleet was soon subdivided into two praetorian fleets at Misenum and Ravenna, supplemented by a growing number of minor ones in the provinces, which were often created on an ad hoc basis for specific campaigns. This organizational structure was maintained almost unchanged until the 4th century.

===== Praetorian fleets =====
The two major fleets were stationed in Italy and acted as a central naval reserve, directly available to the Emperor (hence the designation "praetorian"). In the absence of any naval threat, their duties mostly involved patrolling and transport duties. These were not confined to the waters around Italy, but throughout the Mediterranean. There is epigraphic evidence for the presence of sailors of the two praetorian fleets at Piraeus and Syria. These two fleets were:

- The Classis Misenensis, established in 27 BC and based at Portus Julius. Later Classis praetoria Misenesis Pia Vindex. Detachments of the fleet served at secondary bases, such as Ostia, Puteoli, Centumcellae and other harbors.
- The Classis Ravennas, established in 27 BC and based at Ravenna. Later Classis praetoria Ravennatis Pia Vindex.

===== Provincial fleets =====
The various provincial fleets were smaller than the praetorian fleets and composed mostly of lighter vessels. Nevertheless, it was these fleets that saw action, in full campaigns or raids on the periphery of the Empire.

- The Classis Africana Commodiana Herculea, established by Commodus in 186 to secure the grain shipments (annona) from North Africa to Italy, after the model of the Classis Alexandrina.
- The Classis Alexandriae, based in Alexandria, it controlled the eastern part of the Mediterranean Sea. It was founded by Augustus around 30 BC, probably from ships that fought at the Battle of Actium and manned mostly by Greeks of the Nile Delta. Having supported emperor Vespasian in the civil war of 69, it was awarded of the cognomen Augusta. The fleet was responsible chiefly for the escort of the grain shipments to Rome (and later Constantinople), and also apparently operated the Potamophylaciae, the Nile river patrol.
- The Classis Britannica, established in 40 or 43 AD at Gesoriacum (Boulogne-sur-Mer). It participated in the Roman invasion of Britain and the subsequent campaigns in the island. The fleet was probably based at Rutupiae (Richborough) until 85 AD, when it was transferred to Dubris (Dover). Other bases were Portus Lemanis (Lympne) and Anderitum (Pevensey), while Gesoriacum on the Gallic coast likely remained active. During the 2nd–3rd centuries, the fleet was chiefly employed in transport of supplies and men across the English Channel. The Classis Britannica disappears (at least under that name) from the mid-3rd century, and the sites occupied by it were soon incorporated into the Saxon Shore system.
- The Classis Germanica was established in 12 BC by Drusus at Castra Vetera. It controlled the Rhine river, and was mainly a fluvial fleet, although it also operated in the North Sea. It is noteworthy that the Romans' initial lack of experience with the tides of the ocean left Drusus' fleet stranded on the Zuiderzee. After ca. 30 AD, the fleet moved its main base to the castrum of Alteburg, some 4 km south of Colonia Agrippinensis (modern Cologne). Later granted the honorifics Augusta Pia Fidelis Domitiana following the suppression of the Revolt of Saturninus.
- The Classis nova Libyca, first mentioned in 180, based most likely at Ptolemais on the Cyrenaica.
- The Classis Mauretanica, based at Caesarea Mauretaniae (modern Cherchell), it controlled the African coasts of the western Mediterranean Sea. Established on a permanent basis after the raids by the Moors in the early 170s.
- The Classis Moesica was established sometime between 20 BC and 10 AD. It was based in Noviodunum and controlled the Lower Danube from the Iron Gates to the northwestern Black Sea as far as the Crimea. The honorific Flavia, awarded to it and to the Classis pannonica, may indicate its reorganization by Vespasian.
- The Classis Pannonica, a fluvial fleet controlling the Upper Danube from Castra Regina in Raetia (modern Regensburg) to Singidunum in Moesia (modern Belgrade). Its exact date of establishment is unknown. Some trace it to Augustus' campaigns in Pannonia in ca. 35 BC, but it was certainly in existence by 45 AD. Its main base was probably Taurunum (modern Zemun) at the confluence of the river Sava with the Danube. Under the Flavian dynasty, it received the cognomen Flavia.
- The Classis Perinthia, established after the annexation of Thrace in 46 AD and based in Perinthus. Probably based on the indigenous navy, it operated in the Propontis and the Thracian coast. Probably united with the Classis Pontica at a later stage.
- The Classis Pontica, founded in 64 AD from the Pontic royal fleet, and based in Trapezus, although on occasion it was moved to Byzantium (in ca. 70), and in 170, to Cyzicus. This fleet was used to guard the southern and eastern Black Sea, and the entrance of the Bosporus. According to the historian Josephus, in the latter half of the 1st century, it numbered 40 warships and 3,000 men.
- The Classis Syriaca, established probably under Vespasian, and based in Seleucia Pieria (hence the alternative name Classis Seleucena) in Syria. This fleet controlled the Eastern Mediterranean and the Aegean Sea.

In addition, there is significant archaeological evidence for naval activity by certain legions, which in all likelihood operated their own squadrons: legio XXII Primigenia in the Upper Rhine and Main rivers, legio X Fretensis in the Jordan River and the Sea of Galilee, and several legionary squadrons in the Danube frontier.

==== Late empire ====
Our main source for the structure of the late Roman military is the Notitia Dignitatum, which corresponds to the situation of the 390s for the Eastern Empire and the 420s for the Western Empire. Notable in the Notitia is the large number of smaller squadrons that have been created, most of these fluvial and of a local operational role.

===== Fleets of the Danube frontier =====
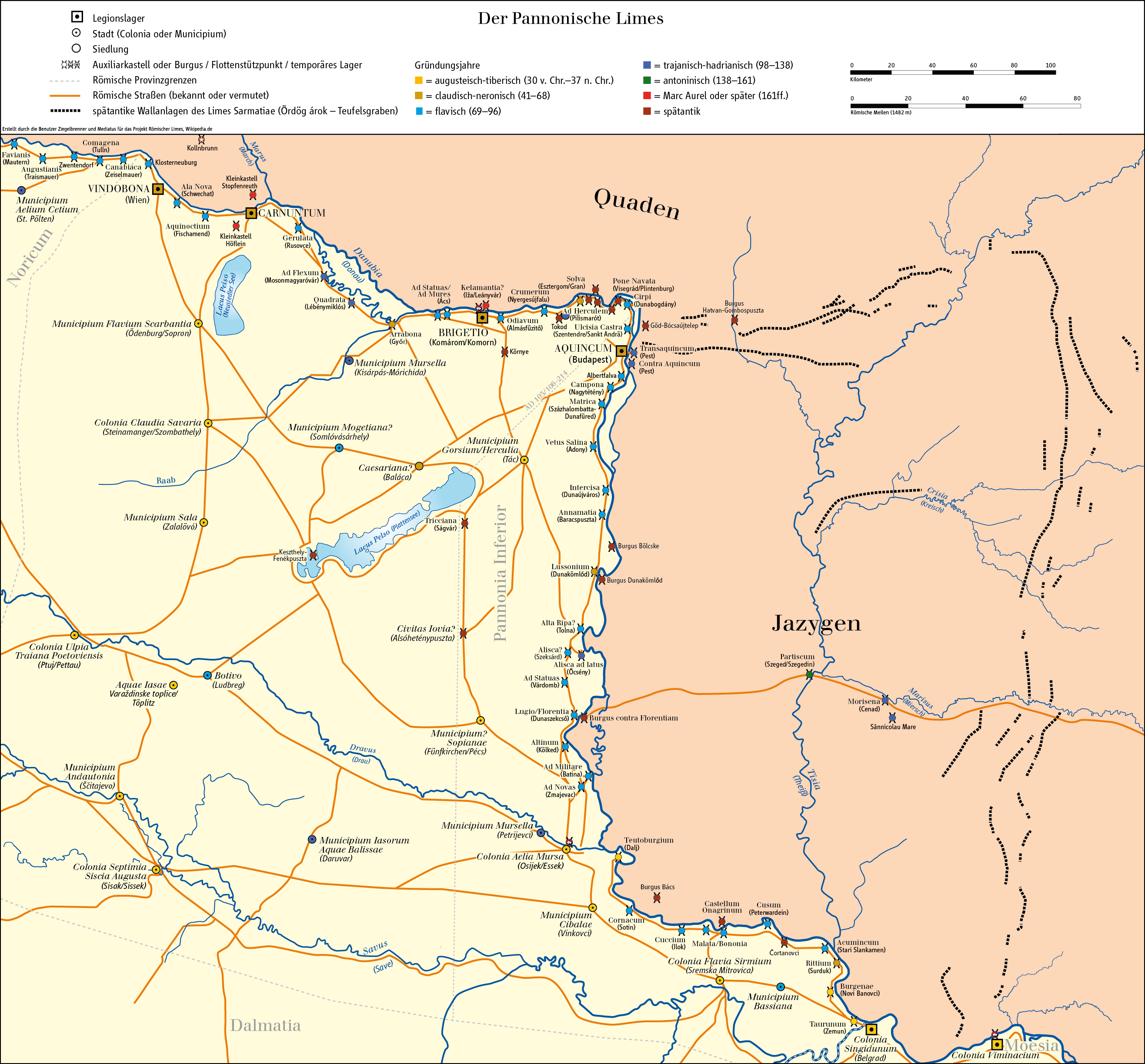
The Upper Danube (Pannonian) limes

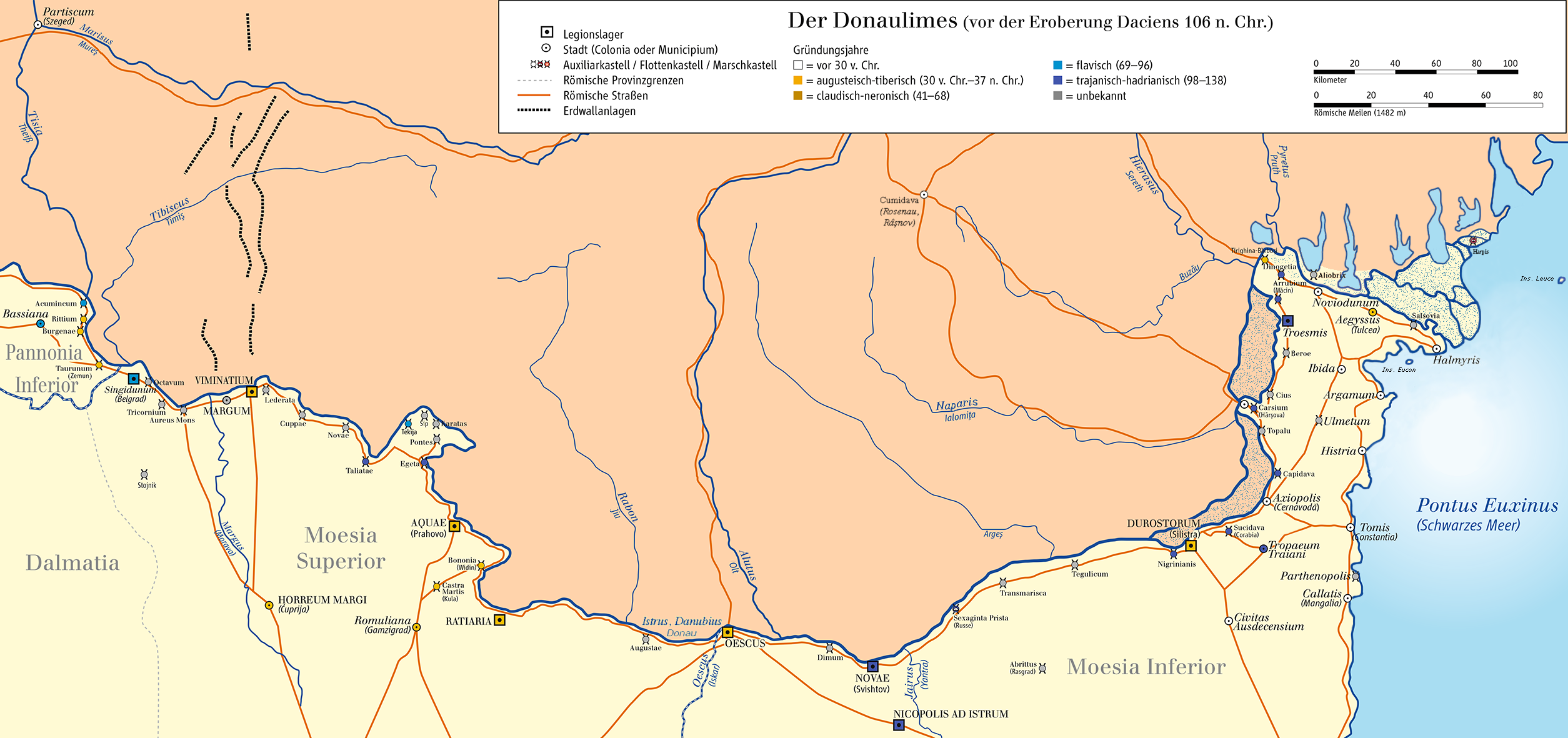
The Lower Danube (Moesian) limes

The Classis Pannonica and the Classis Moesica (at the beginning of the 5th century) were broken up into several smaller squadrons, collectively termed Classis Histrica, authority of the frontier commanders (duces). with bases at Mursa in Pannonia II, Florentia in Pannonia Valeria, Arruntum in Pannonia I, Viminacium in Moesia I and Aegetae in Dacia ripensis. Smaller fleets are also attested on the tributaries of the Danube: the Classis Arlapensis et Maginensis (based at Arelape and Comagena) and the Classis Lauriacensis (based at Lauriacum) in Pannonia I, the Classis Stradensis et Germensis, based at Margo in Moesia I, and the Classis Ratianensis, in Dacia ripensis. The naval units were complemented by port garrisons and marine units, drawn from the army. In the Danube frontier these were:

- In Pannonia I and Noricum ripensis, naval detachments (milites liburnarii) of the legio XIV Gemina and the legio X Gemina at Carnuntum and Arrabonae, and of the legio II Italica at Ioviacum.
- In Pannonia II, the I Flavia Augusta (at Sirmium) and the II Flavia are listed under their prefects.
- In Moesia II, two units of sailors (milites nauclarii) at Appiaria and Altinum.
- In Scythia Minor, marines (muscularii) of legio II Herculia at Inplateypegiis and sailors (nauclarii) at Flaviana.

===== Fleets in Western Europe =====
In the West, and in particular in Gaul, several fluvial fleets had been established. These came under the command of the magister peditum of the West, and were:

- The Classis Anderetianorum, based at Parisii (Paris) and operating in the Seine and Oise rivers.
- The Classis Ararica, based at Caballodunum (Chalon-sur-Saône) and operating in the Saône River.
- A Classis barcariorum, composed of small vessels, at Eburodunum (modern Yverdon-les-Bains) at Lake Neuchâtel.
- The Classis Comensis at Lake Como.
- The old praetorian fleets, the Classis Misenatis and the Classis Ravennatis are still listed, albeit with no distinction indicating any higher importance than the other fleets. The "praetorian" surname is still attested until the early 4th century, but absent from Vegetius or the Notitia.
- The Classis fluminis Rhodani, based at Arelate and operating in the Rhône River. It was complemented with a marine detachment (milites muscularii) based at Marseille.
- The Classis Sambrica, based at Locus Quartensis (unknown location) and operating in the Somme River and the Channel. It came under the command of the dux Beligae Secundae.
- The Classis Venetum, based at Aquileia and operating in the northern Adriatic Sea. This fleet may have been established to ensure communications with the imperial capitals in the Po Valley (Ravenna and Milan) and with Dalmatia.

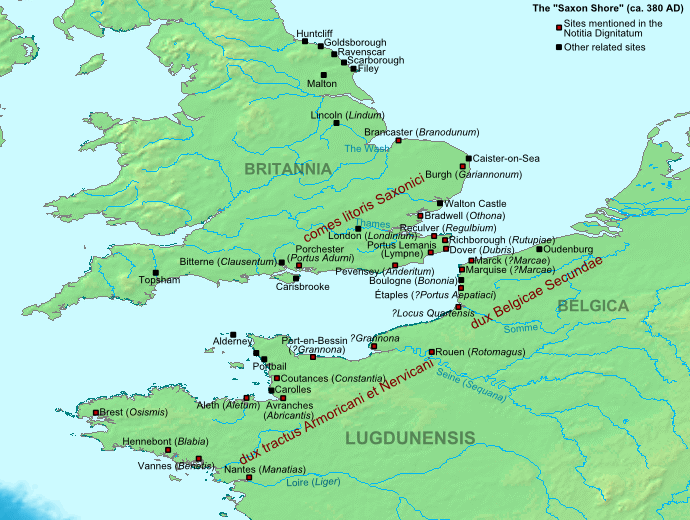
Bases and command sectors of the Saxon Shore system

It is notable that, with the exception of the praetorian fleets (whose retention in the list does not necessarily signify an active status), the old fleets of the Principate are missing. The Classis Britannica vanishes under that name after the mid-3rd century; its remnants were later subsumed in the Saxon Shore system.

By the time of the Notitia Dignitatum, the Classis Germanica has ceased to exist (it is last mentioned under Julian in 359), most probably due to the collapse of the Rhine frontier after the Crossing of the Rhine by the barbarians in winter 405–406, and the Mauretanian and African fleets had been disbanded or taken over by the Vandals.

===== Fleets in the Eastern Mediterranean =====
As far as the East is concerned, we know from legal sources that the Classis Alexandrina and the Classis Seleucena continued to operate, and that in ca. 400 a Classis Carpathia was detached from the Syrian fleet and based at the Aegean island of Karpathos. A fleet is known to have been stationed at Constantinople itself, but no further details are known about it.

=== Ports ===
Major Roman ports were:

- Portus Julius, located at Misenum
- Classis, near Ravenna
- Alexandria
- Leptis Magna
- Ostia
- Portus
- Port of Mainz (Mogontiacum, river navy on the Rhine)

== Tactics ==
Naval tactics were undeveloped during the early history of naval warfare. Battles primarily consisted of attempting to board the enemy's ship and then to engage in melee combat. To ensure that the ships were capable of maneuvering around the enemy ships they were deployed with space between them. During a battle sailors would try to disable the enemy ship by sweeping close to the other ship, thus breaking off its oars. Following this the sailors on both ships would fire arrows at each other. Two known ancient Greco-Roman naval strategies were the Periplous and Dikeplous. Periplous consisted of forming a line of ships while using reserves to attack the flanks of the enemy. Dikeplous consisted of forcing a gap in the enemy line, while attacking any remaining enemy ships. Larger ships replaced triremes during the 5th century BCE. These larger ships utilized the corvus to board and attack enemy ships. There were 40 marines and a 100 legionaries on Roman ships. These soldiers, called classiarii, used overwhelming force to win battles. Many ships would be painted blue for camouflage purposes.

== See also ==
- Caligula's Giant Ship
- Nemi ships
- Roman shipyard of Stifone (Narni)
- Classiarius
