= Naulochus (disambiguation) =

Naulochus is a city on the north coast of Sicily.

Naulochus or Naulochos may also refer to:

- Battle of Naulochus, a naval battle fought in 36 BC, off Naulochus, Sicily
- Naulochus, the name in ancient sources of Elasa Island off of Cape Sidero, the northeast tip of Crete, Greece
- Naulochus (Ionia), a town of ancient Ionia, now in Turkey
- Naulochus (Thrace) or Naulochos, a small port of Thrace, now in Bulgaria
