= Roman shipyard of Stifone (Narni) =

Archaeological site in Umbria, Italy

The Roman shipyard of Stifone is an archaeological find of Roman origin recently discovered in Umbria, in the municipality of Narni, inside an artificial channel adjacent the Nera River, about 900 metres down-river from the village of Stifone. Its position is just behind the remains of the river port of the ancient city of Narni.

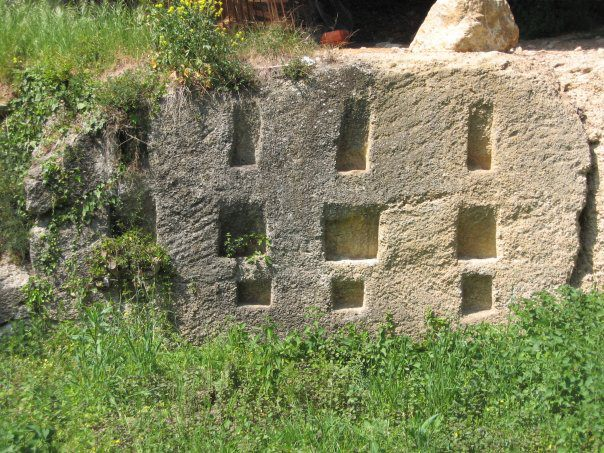
Remains of the shipyard

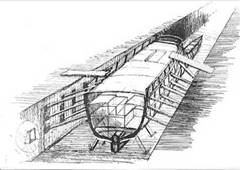
Graphic reconstruction of the shipyard drawn by the artist Alvaro Caponi

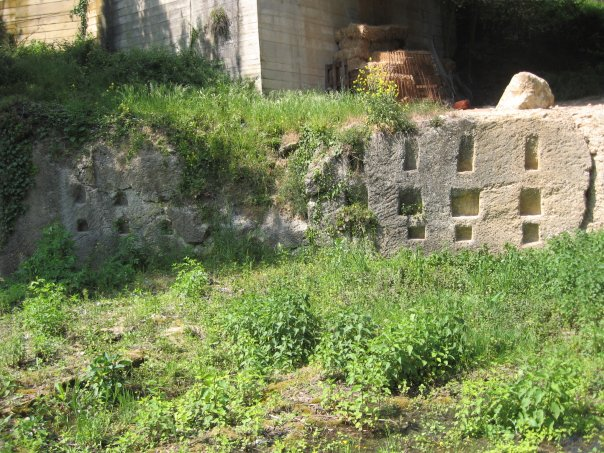
Remains of the shipyard

== The shipyard in the local historiography ==
Even before the discovery, following some popular tales handed down through the centuries, it is indicative to note how the local historiography had already mentioned the ancient presence of a similar structure. The former mayor of Narni, Rutilio Robusti, asserted:

"The origin of the word Stifone comes from the Greek and it has been used to indicate a place where timber boats and rafts were built to be sent towards Rome" (Rutilio Robusti, Narni, guida della città e dintorni, 1924)

That contribution has been taken up by other authors, as Italo Ciaurro and Guerriero Bolli, both of whom have mentioned the origin of the toponym, the second writing of a shipyard of Stifone although he was thinking of the Byzantine period. Without any evidence to support the theory, the story of an ancient shipyard was never fully investigated, leaving only a general idea based on a few quotes. With Robusti's contribution, the normal thinking was that the site had perhaps been used for the construction of river rafts for the transportation of people and goods. Once the ruins were actually discovered, it was realized that due to the scale of the works and effort that had gone into building it, it may have been something more. The possibility that it had a connection to the Punic Wars shouldn't be excluded; for this reason, the volunteers who have been working to expand the knowledge of the site are hoping for more attention from archaeologists and public administrations. Being a unique and valuable find, it is important that it be dated as accurately as possible. The potential knowledge that may be gleaned from the site should not be underestimated.

== The ancient navigability of the Nera River ==
The ancient navigability of the Nera River, as a natural way to send farm produce towards Rome, following the Tiber River in Orte, is confirmed by the classic authors Strabo and Tacitus. The Greek geographer refers about "not big boats"; the Latin historian instead describes in detail the journey of the consul Gnaeus Calpurnius Piso and his wife Plancina who, in the 19, returning to Rome from the provinces of Syria, decided to leave the Via Flaminia and taking a ship at Narni.

« Starting from Narni, to avoid suspects or because who fears is uncertain in his plans, he followed the waterway of Nera River and then of Tiber. So he increased the popular grudge because, once landed with the ship at Cesari’s grave, in broad daylight and with riverside full of people, they advanced cheerful in face, him among a crowd of clients and Plancina with her following of women» (Tacitus, Annales, Book III, 9)

However, the navigability of the Nera River is related only with the last part of its waterway, included between Stifone and the confluence of Nera with the Tiber. The narrow gorges below Narni, in fact, make impossible this practice.

== The position of the river port and its rediscovery ==
The geographical coordinates of the ancient river port of Narni were revealed in the 16th century by the Jesuit Fulvio Cardoli, who saw in person its traces. Below his contribute:

"About one thousand steps beyond Taizzano, there was time once a port along the Nera River, as demonstrated by some traces" (F. Cardoli, Ex notis Fulvij Carduli S.J. presbyteri Narniensis de Civitatis Narniae, Origine et antiquatibus).

The river port was found in the same position in the year 1879, when an informer of the marquis Giovanni Eroli noticed the remains of two big pilasters used to fasten the boats.

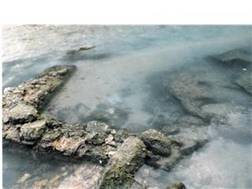
Remains of the river port

With the construction of some dams up stream, and the consequent rise of the river level, the port was tacitly believed as submerged. The remains of it, contrary to popular belief, were however in the same place described by the Jesuit, although hidden among the bushy vegetation. Only in the year 1992 was the port mentioned again in local historiography, when the archaeologist Roberto Nini wrote of the area. Some years later, the river port was visited by the superintendent for the regional archaeological heritage, Daniela Monacchi, but the close presence of an ancient shipyard was not noticed, due to a body of stagnant water which has obstructed the passage.

== The finding of the shipyard ==
Meanwhile, someone had decided to patrol the channel which hosts the remains of the shipyard, in particular a group of people from the close village of Nera Montoro who knew the old popular story regarding the presence of a similar structure. After perceiving its destination, the local artist Alvaro Caponi has tried to reconstruct the hypothetical functioning producing some sketches, but despite its importance, the discovery has remained without any development. This till the beginning of the new century, when a young free-lance journalist, Christian Armadori, taken to the place by the entrant archaeologist Claudio Maturi with the prospect of an article, has been stunned by the find insomuch as undertaking an appropriate research. Then, in the year 2006, a group of volunteers has established the cultural association Porto di Narni Approdo d'Europa with the aim to put the archaeological site under the attention of the local government, and few time later also the major of Narni, Stefano Bigaroni, has gone to the area in order to check the plausibility of the discovery.

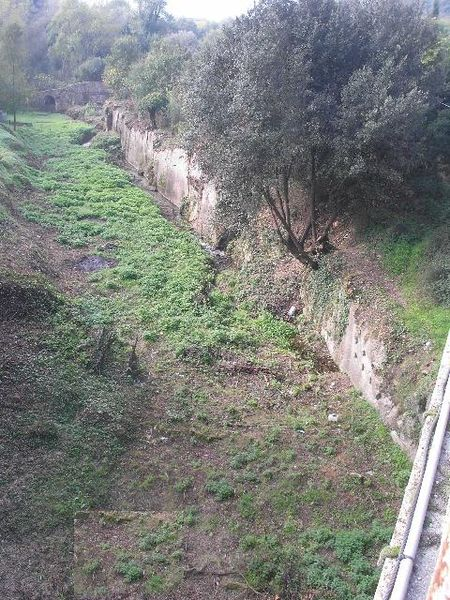
The artificial channel with the remains of the shipyard, taken by Giuseppe Fortunati

== The structure of the shipyard ==
The remains are situated inside an artificial channel dug in the rock, about 280 m long, once united with the Nera River upstream and downstream, as showed by some maps of the land office. It is composed with two opposite cut walls, about 16.5 m apart, which showed a series of squared holes disposed on three lines, for a total of 30 incisions per wall, on the theoretical basis carried out by the artist who has reconstructed its scale drawing (there are only 27 holes still visible). The function of these holes has been supposed to be for inserting lateral props to support and stabilise ships. The fact the holes run for about 13 metres per wall, and considering how the props should not be necessary for prow and stern (the thinnest parts of the boat), the measures appear quite substantive for simple river rafts, especially with reference to the notable distance between walls. So far, it has seemed more prudent not to speak about Roman quinquereme or trireme without the essential comparisons, especially considering how the historians themselves are not agreed about the exact measures of these warships. However, most of them share similar opinions when they speak about their draft, supposed to be quite moderate, then potentially suitable to descend along the last stretch of the Nera River, which is very copious of water before to flow into the Tiber River. The reasons of a shipyard quite far from the Tyrrhenian Sea, but however well linked with it through the river way, should be found on the abundance of raw material offered by the Umbrian territory (wood of different quality), with the area of Narni fall under the Roman domination since 299 BC. In add, it is interesting to ascertain how the classical authors of that period did not supply clear information about the different position of the navy yard, included Polybius who has been the most important historians of the Punic Wars. The need of safety could be linked with the choice to assemble ships in the up-country, without the risk to be exposed at the potential threats of the enemy from the sea. In fact, the modern historians are in agreement to collocate the ancient navalia inside the city of Rome, in the area of Campus Martius. It means the shipyard of Stifone could be only one of the different structures used at that époque, in whom the imposing effort made by the Romans in the year 261 BC to create their first war fleet is famous. However, it is right and proper to insist how the hypothesis, although generally shared by the researchers, are at the moment still under assessment.

== The other finds emerged in the area ==
A series of finds emerged in the surrounding fields had already indicated how in the past an urban settlement was based in the area. In the year 1914 an ancient spa pool was found (the zone is very rich in water springs), while two stones with inscriptions came to light at short distance from the shipyard in the years 1850 and 1970. Then, a new proof of the importance of the area in the Roman époque has recently emerged with the discovery of a cistern 25 metres deep, still very close to the archaeological site. The ancient importance of that territory in the Roman ages is additionally confirmed by a narration of Livy for the year 207 BC, especially as a strategic point. After having intercepted a correspondence between Hasdrubal and his brother Hannibal, the Roman legions decided to block the passage in proximity of the shipyard area, as it is clearly deductible by the geographical coordinates provided by the author.

« Two knights of Narnia were returned from the battle in the camp situated at the entrance of the narrow gorge which opens the way to Umbria » (Livy, Ab urbe condita, XXVII)

The narrow gorge which opens the way to Umbria is exactly behind the archaeological area, situated just in proximity of its entrance.

== The archaeological area today ==
The remains of the shipyard, despite the pleas, are at the moment completely abandoned, with vegetation and stagnant waters putting its partial integrity under the risk of further damages. The area, possibly subjected to sudden floods due to the presence of dams located upstream, is under the management of the multinational company Endesa Italia. Visits are only possible with particular authorization. In addition, the original location of it has been modified in the Middle Ages when several watermills were built.

== Present state of the studies ==
The studies carried out by the free-lance journalist Christian Armadori with the support of volunteers Sara Uffreduzzi and Vittorio Budassi who were involved in the cultural association, was eventually published in February 2012 by an editor specialized in the archeological field, with the endorsement of experts of the University of Perugia and evaluated the credibility of the hypothesis. The aim of the author is providing an input in order to develop the knowledge of the area and rouse the interest of the scientific community.

== Bibliography ==
- Endesa Italia Magazine, July 2007
- Christian Armadori, Il Porto di Narnia e il Cantiere Navale Romano sul Fiume Nera, ed. Quasar, 2012
- Giuseppe Fortunati, Narni e Narnia, Heos Editrice, 2006
- Alvaro Caponi, I segreti del porto etrusco e il cantiere navale di Narnia : ritrovamenti unici al mondo : Villa Pompeia Celerina, Ricerca obiettivo, 2006.
- Corriere dell'Umbria, 27 November 2005.
- Il Messaggero Umbria edition, 25 February 2006

== See also ==
- Roman navy – Navy of ancient Rome
- Nemi ships – Ancient Roman ships, found in lake of Nemi in 1929
- Caligula's Giant Ship – Ruined Roman barge
- Classis Britannica – Provincial naval fleet of ancient Rome
- Classis Flavia Moesica – Fleet of the Roman Empire based on the Danube river
- Classis Misenensis – Senior fleet of the imperial Roman navy
- Classis Ravennas – Roman fleet based at Ravenna
