= Alexander the Great's edict to Priene =

Alexander the Great issued an edict, probably in the summer of 334 BC, to the city of Priene. On the Temple of Athena Polias a section of the edict was inscribed across four marble blocks "near the top of the east face of the north anta of the pronaos." It was inscribed in Koine Greek in the 280s BC during the reign of Lysimachus. The same engraver inscribed a decree and letter of Lysimachus. Above the edict is the temple's dedicatory inscription in the Ionic dialect, which was erected by Alexander himself. All these inscriptions are now in the British Museum.

The fragmentary inscription reads:

Of those residing in Naulochon, as many as are [Prienians] are to be independent and free, possessing the [land] and all the houses in the city and the countryside [like the] Prienians [themselves]; ... But the ... [?villages] of the Myrs[eloi] and the Pe[.....] and the countryside I decree to be mine, and those dwelling in these villages are to pay the tribute; I release from the syntaxis the city of (the) Prienians, and the garrison ...

Naulochon was the port of Priene. Susan Sherwin-White interpreted the edict as confirming that those Prienians who resided at Naulochon retained the same rights as those living in Priene, identifying those villages around Priene that owed tax to the king and confirming Priene's exemption from taxation. Peter Thonemann interprets the edict as confirming the freedom and autonomy of the Greeks of Naulochon who were not Prienian citizens. He rejects Sherwin-White's reading "Pedieis", a term from the native inhabitants of the plain of the delta of the Maeander, believing that only native villages in the vicinity of Naulochon were listed. For Thonemann, the significance of the edict is that it "marks the moment at which ‘being Greek’ in Asia Minor and the Levant ceased to be solely a matter of cultural prestige" and became "a matter of maximizing public finances", since Alexander had granted "wide-ranging fiscal privileges" to Naulochon, "but only for 'as many of them as are Greeks'." This policy helps explain the rapid Hellenization of Asia Minor after 334 BC.

== Bibliography ==
- Thonemann, Peter (2012). "Alexander, Priene, and Naulochon". In Paraskevi Martzavou; Nikolaos Papazarkadas (eds.). Epigraphical Approaches to the Post-classical Polis: Fourth Century BC to Second Century AD. Oxford University Press. pp. 23–36.
- Sherwin-White, Susan M. (1985). "Ancient Archives: The Edict of Alexander to Priene, a Reappraisal". The Journal of Hellenic Studies. 105: 69–89. doi:10.2307/631523. JSTOR 631523.
