= Portus Lemanis =

Roman Saxon Shore fort in Kent, England

- Kent, England, UK
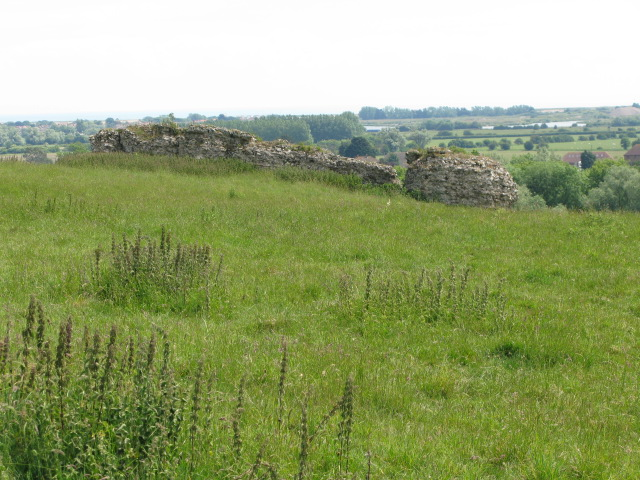
- Remains of Portus Lemanis

Location
- Location in Kent
- Coordinates: 51.06827°N 1.0207°E
- Grid reference: TR117342

Portus Lemanis, also known as Lemanae, was the Latin name of a Roman Saxon Shore fort, settlement and port in southern Kent. The modern village of Lympne derives its name from the ancient port. The site, known locally as Stutfall Castle, is on private land which is accessible by public footpath.

== History ==
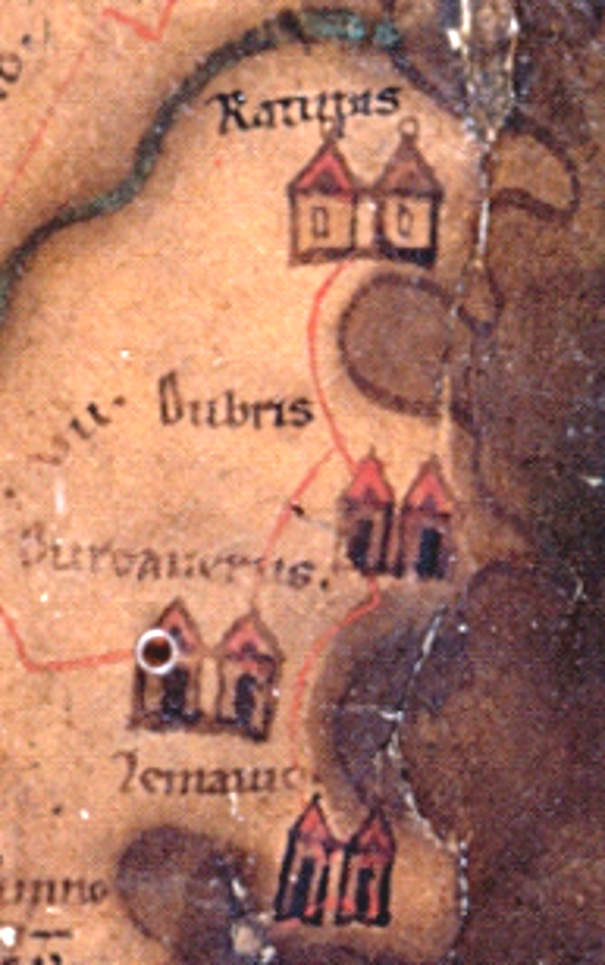
Roman Canterbury, Richborough, Dover, Lympne on the 4th-century Peutinger Map.

The first documentary mention of the site is found in the late 3rd-century Antonine Itinerary, where it is mentioned as lying 68,000 paces (68 Roman miles) from Londinium (London) and 16,000 paces from the cantonal capital Durovernum Cantiacorum (the modern Canterbury). However, there is archaeological evidence of much earlier use as a naval base: tiles stamped CL BR have been found indicating that sailors or marines of the fleet, the Classis Britannica, were involved in its construction, as well as an inscription dated to the first third of the 2nd century (RIB 66) on an altar stone, dedicated to the god Neptune by a Lucius Aufidius Pantera, prefect of the Classis Britannica. According to the 5th-century Notitia Dignitatum, the fort was garrisoned by a regiment raised in Tournai (numerus Turnacensium) and formed part of a defence system known as the Saxon Shore under the command of a Count. The last mention of Lemanis in Latin sources is in the late 7th-century Ravenna Cosmography, by which time the site, along with the rest of Britain, had long been severed from the Roman Empire.

== Location and construction ==
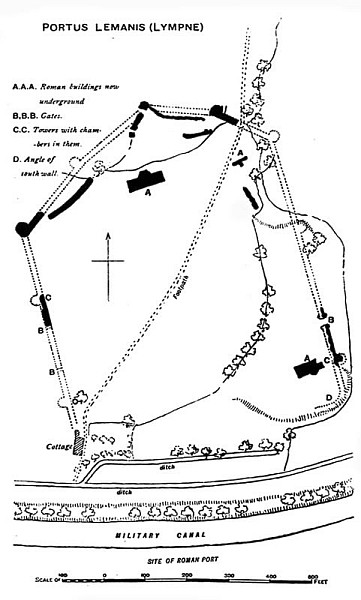
19th-century plan of Portus Lemanis

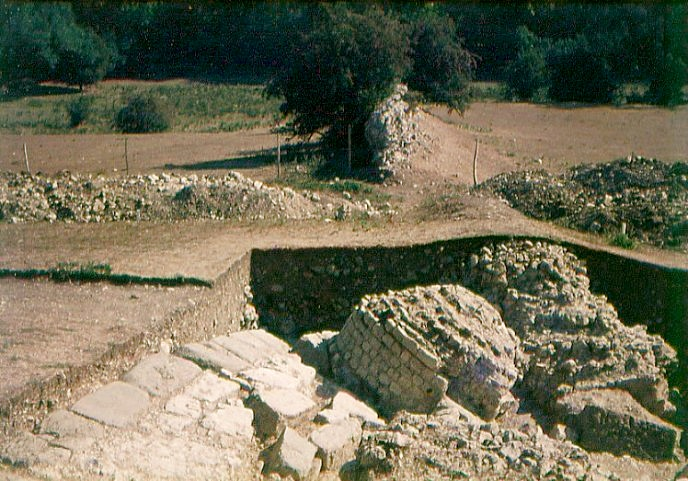
Archaeological excavations of the east gate of Portus Lemanis in 1976

The fort stood on a hill overlooking a reach of sea which has since been drained to form the Romney Marsh. A harbour lay to the south and east. A vicus (civilian settlement) had also sprung up in its proximity, situated astride the road that led to Canterbury.

The construction of the Saxon Shore-era fort can be dated to the late 270s, as is evidenced by its late-style characteristics, including forward-projecting towers. The remains are in poor condition, since the ground, mostly clay, has at places given way. The southern side of the fort is wholly missing, and elsewhere the remains have been moved at various angles, while little evidence of interior structures (remains of a bath and possibly the principia) survives. The site is still relatively unknown: the only major archaeological excavations were carried out by Roach Smith in 1850 and 1852.

The remains of the main rampart show a strong construction ca. 3.9 m wide, and surviving sections are still between 6 and 8 m in height. The wall is built of recycled material from earlier structures and bonded with bands of brick, which include several roofing tiles. Originally, the fort may have had about 14 towers. A single main gate survives towards the east, as well as several posterns. Its shape may have been an irregular pentagon, which covered an area of ca. 3.4 ha; but this shape would be unusual for Roman forts, especially in the Saxon Shore system.

== Sources ==
- Fields, Nic (2006). Rome's Saxon Shore - Coastal Defences of Roman Britain AD 250-500 (Fortress 56). Osprey Publishing. ISBN 978-1-84603-094-9.
- Johnston, David E.; et als. (1977). "The Saxon Shore" (PDF). CBA Research Report (18).
