= Port of Mainz =

Coordinates: 50.01775°N 8.257105°E

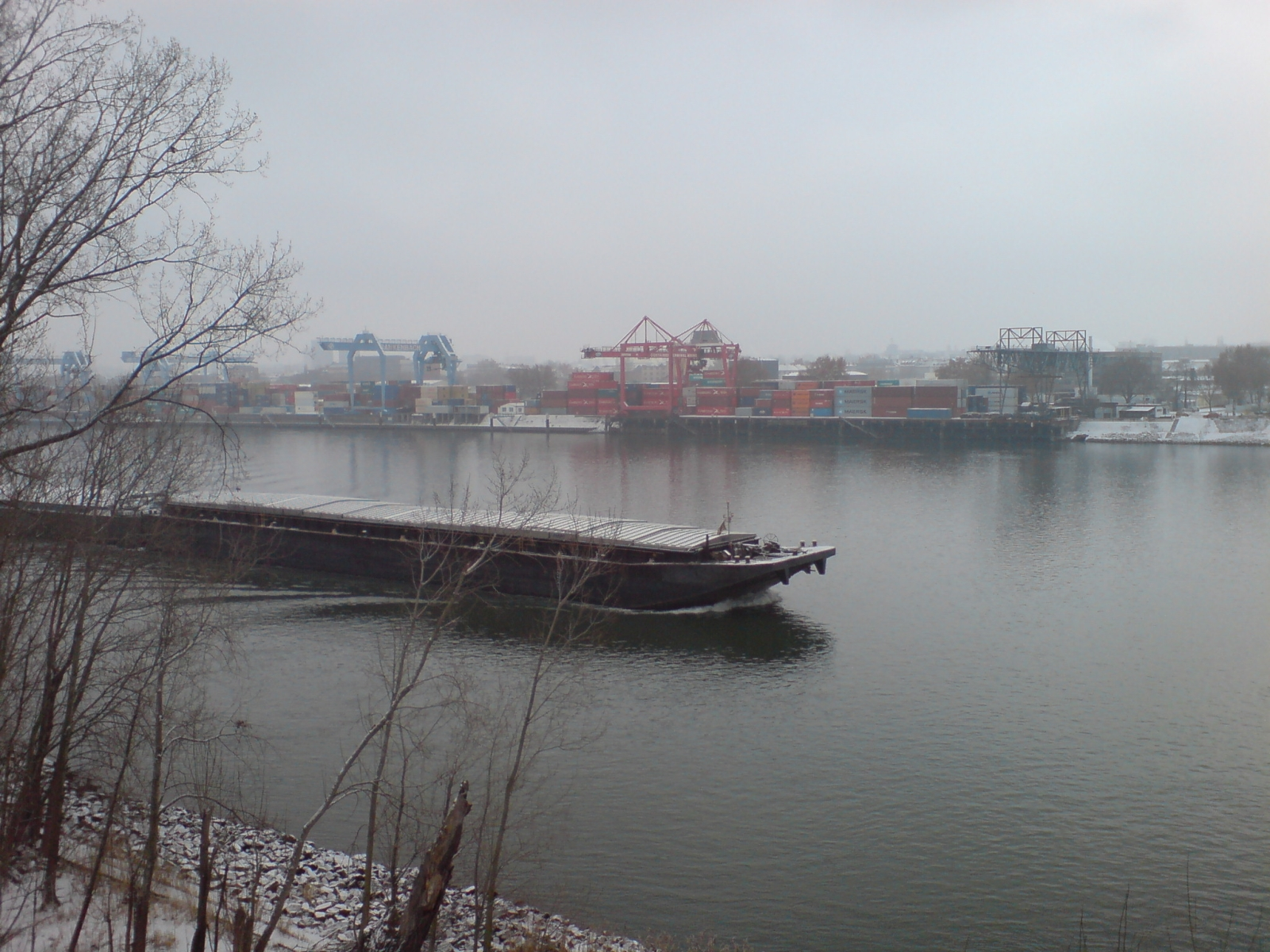
A view from the eastern side of the Rhine.

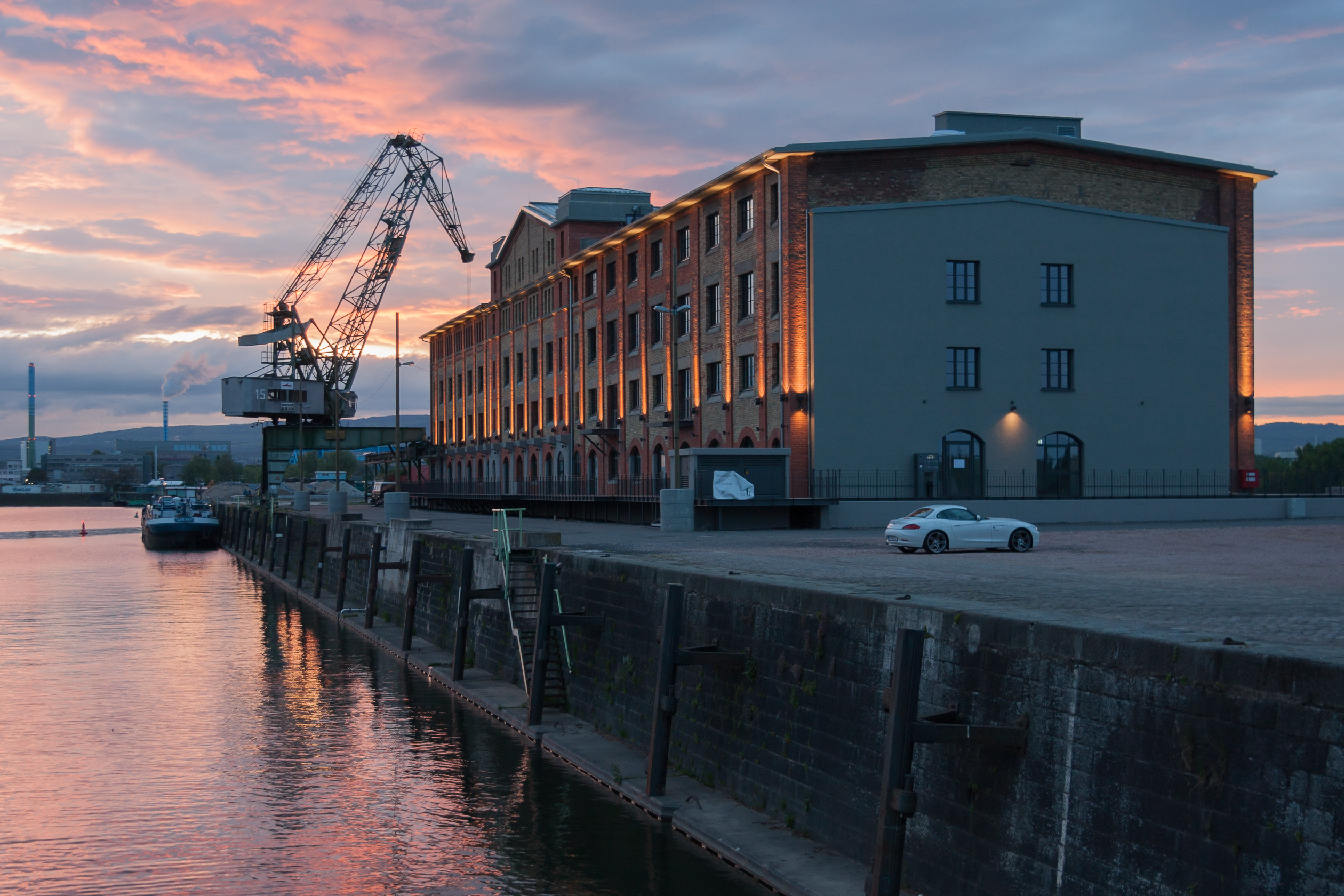
Former wine warehouse on the southern jetty of the port Zollhafen

The Port of Mainz (or Mainzer Hafen in German) is the port of Mainz, Germany. Lying on the western bank of the Rhine river, it has a long history reaching back through the Middle Ages to Roman times. The modern port facilities, existing for approximately 120 years in their general environs, are located mostly to the north of the city proper, and will be extended to the north of their current location during the coming years to make space for a new residential area.

== History ==
=== Roman times ===
Mainz ('Mogontiacum' in Latin times) during Roman times was a major colonial town, the centre of Roman life in the area for many centuries. The facilities included a trade port at the 'Dimesser Ort' (in the area of the current port), and a military port (in the area of the current old town), from which the vessels of the Roman river navy patrolled the Rhine.

During the gradual Roman retreat from their remaining possessions in front of invading German tribes, some of the naval vessels were abandoned in a section of the port (likely around 407 AD, when the city was sacked for the second time). Their remains rested in the earth and mud of the riverbank before being recovered 1981/1982 during excavation works for a Hilton hotel. They are now exhibited together with two life-sized replica ships in a dedicated local museum.

=== Middle Ages ===
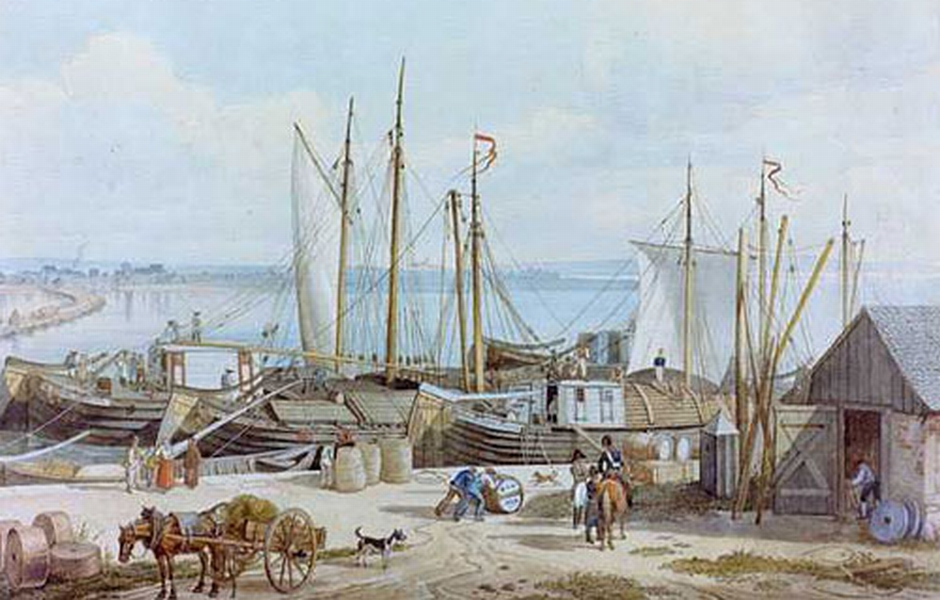
Sailing barges in the 19th century.

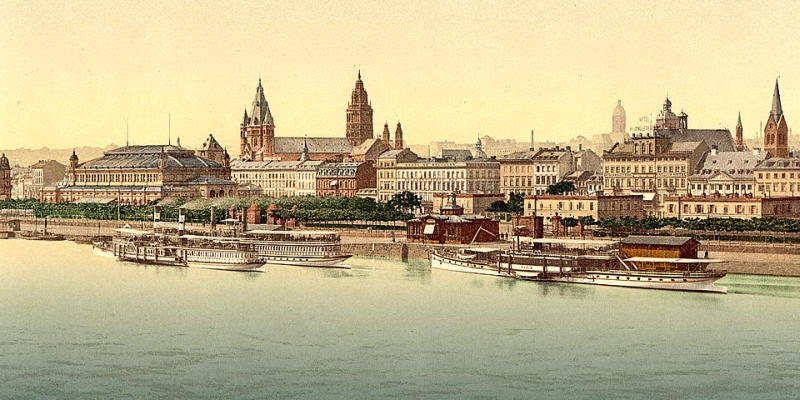
Excursion riverboats in the early 20th century.

For the early Middle Ages, there is limited information about any port facilities, possibly reflecting the much-reduced stature of the city. However, in 1317 Mainz, in addition to becoming a market town, received staple rights. This meant that any river trading ship had to unload its goods and offer them for sale to the local citizenry for three days. Only after this period was it allowed to travel on with its remaining goods. This legal control over the merchant shipping on the Rhine helped make the city rich.

=== Modern age ===
Industrial Age

The increasing importance of the wine trade in Mainz helped keep the port prosperous after the end of the Middle Ages. During 1860-1885, the Rhine was also being channelised and dredged to become a major route for the increasing trade of an industrialising Europe. This resulted in two new port areas being built for the city, the Winterhafen ('Winter port') south of the old town (just north of the Südbrücke), while a new Zollhafen ('Customs Port') was constructed north of the city, in the general area of the old Roman trade port. The Zollhafen was surrounded by fortresses, but its commercial function was clearly expressed in the many stately warehouses that were soon erected around the 12 ha water and on the 15 ha land area. At the time, it was considered one of the most modern river ports of the world.

Beyond World War II

During the Second World War, the Zollhafen (by now clearly the main industrial port), was about 85% destroyed. Of the old buildings, few survived, amongst them the massive wine storage building, a concrete structure erected in 1912. However, the port quickly recovered, and as early as 1950 reached its pre-war average annual turnover, with 740,497 tonnes. The 1 million tonnes mark was reached in 1952. In the following decades, most changes were operational or technical only, such as the installation of modern cranes in the 1980s. In the 1990s, plans were then begun for a possible extension or relocation of facilities that were increasingly by their location close to the growing residential areas of the city.

== Operations ==
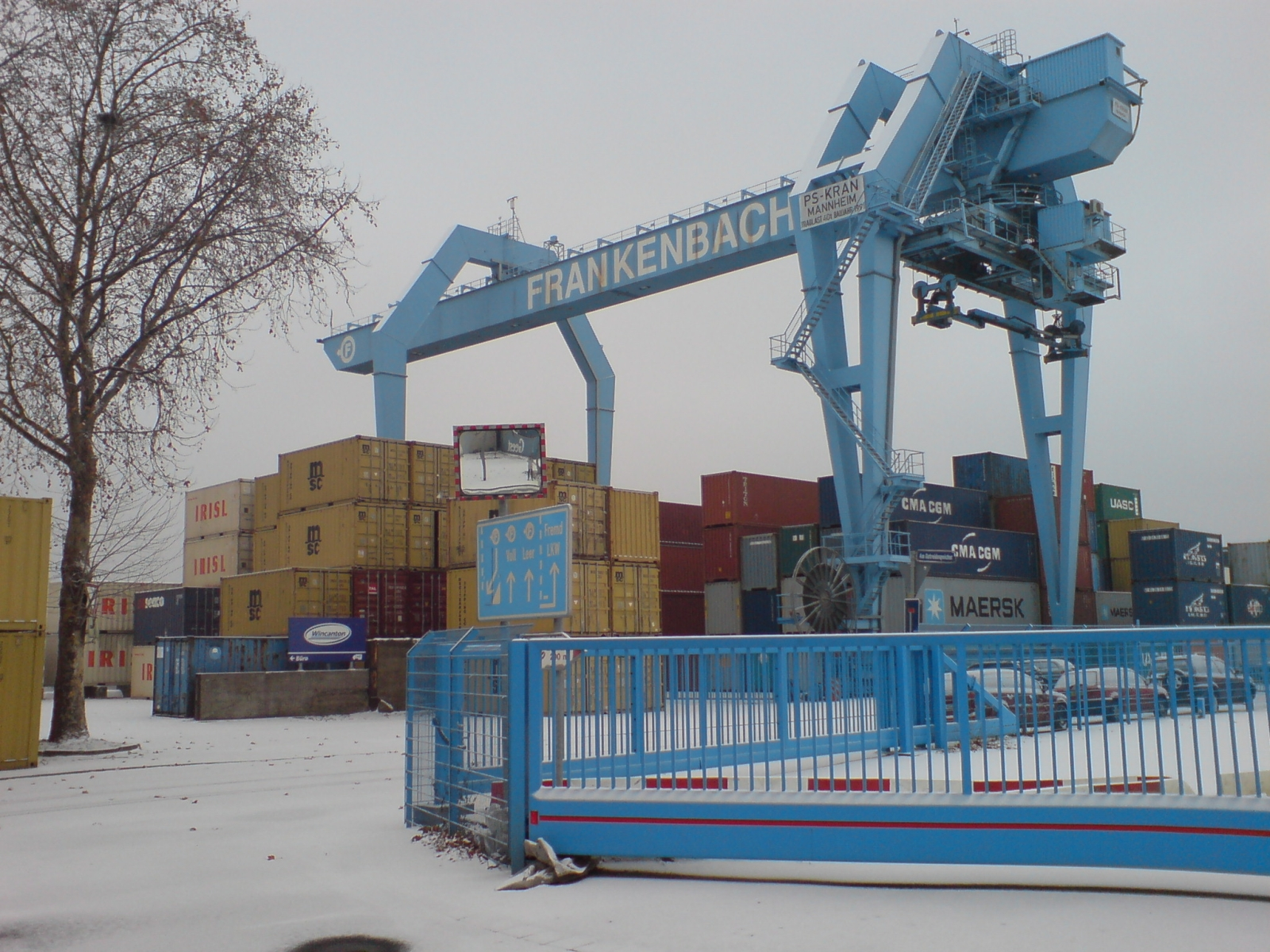
A crane in the current container terminal.

The port is owned (since 1949) and operated by the local publicly owned utility company Mainzer Stadtwerke AG, via the holding company 'Mainzer Hafen GmbH'. It currently operates on about 30 ha, and turned over 1.4 million tonnes in 2006, serving 1,381 ships and handling 112,964 containers. Next to containers, food and feedstock, petrochemicals and building supplies were the most important goods.

Relocation

The ancient port stretched from the 'Am Zollhafen' street northwards to the Nordbrücke. Since the area had become constrained for modern-day port operations, a section of riverfront to the north of the bridge had been selected for a new container terminal. Part of the existing areas of the harbor will be transformed into a residential quarter. The new container terminal is intended to raise the container volumes sufficiently to push the port back into the Top 5 of German river container ports.

The new site provides 522 m of quayside, 80000 m^{2} operational surface for 10,300 TEU, 4 shipside crane bridges and 1 landside crane bridge, and will see up to 700 truck movements per day, or 454.400 TEU movements per year. 36 connections for refrigerated containers are installed, with a possibility to double the capacity. It is connected to the railway network via Mainz Hauptbahnhof with a double track. The amount of the subsidy by the land Rhineland-Palatinate increased to €9 million for the railway connection. The port is connected to the motorway system in Germany by Bundesautobahn 643. The terminal is operated by a private company Frankenbach (75%) in cooperation with the local publicly owned Stadtwerke Mainz AG (25%) as the site owner. The €30 million overall cost had been shared between the partners and the land Rhineland-Palatinate.

Time to the Port of Rotterdam is 24 hours descending and 60 hours ascending again from Rotterdam.

Excursion ships

Increasingly, especially in the 20th century, Mainz also began to be used as a starting point or stopover location for Rhine tourist cruises. These excursion mainly visit the stretch of the river known as the 'Romantic Rhine' of castles and cliffs, being mainly the length between Mainz and Koblenz, the Rhine Gorge. The excursion ships do not have port facilities as such in Mainz, but rather tie up at modest floating jetty terminals in the area of the old town, south of the Zollhafen.
