= Harpax =

Grappling-iron in ancient Greece and Rome

The harpax or harpago or harpaga (Ancient Greek: ἁρπάγη, ἅρπαγα lit. "grabber, seizer, robber"; GEN ἅρπαγος harpagos) was a grappling-iron. Its name, derived from the Greek verb harpazo (ἁρπάζω), meaning "to seize" or "to snatch". It was a versatile tool used in both domestic and military contexts in ancient Greece and Rome.

== Domestic Use ==
In domestic life, the harpago was most commonly used as a flesh-hook or grappling-iron. This instrument was particularly useful in the kitchen, where it was employed to remove boiled meat from a cauldron. Described as resembling a hand with fingers bent inward, the harpago allowed cooks to easily lift large pieces of meat from the pot. According to the Scholiast on Aristophanes, it was “an instrument used in cookery.” Greeks also called it λύκος (meaning wolf), κρεάγρα and κρεαγρίς (both meaning "flesh-hook" or "meat hook).

A similar instrument, or even the hook itself, was used to draw up a bucket or recover objects that had fallen into a well.

== Warfare ==
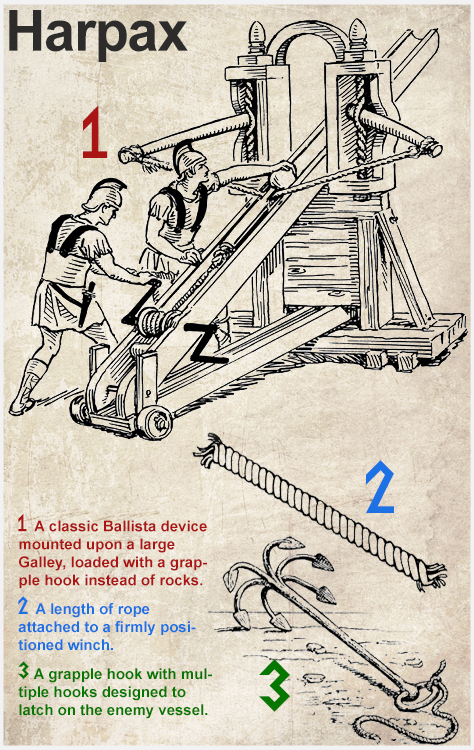
The parts of the Harpax

In warfare, the harpago took on a much larger and more formidable form and was said to have been invented by Pericles. It was similar to the Roman harpagones or manus ferreae, and was used as a grappling iron to capture enemy ships. These were large, iron hooks designed to latch onto the rigging or hull of opposing vessels. Once a harpago secured its hold on an enemy ship, it could be used to drag the ship closer to the attacker’s vessel, allowing for easier boarding or destruction. It was used by Duilius against the Carthaginians.

It was also used by Marcus Vipsanius Agrippa against Sextus Pompey during the naval battles of the Sicilian revolt. It was deployed at the Battle of Naulochus in 36 BC. Appian explains the device was "called the 'grip', a piece of wood, five cubits long bound with iron and having rings at the extremities. To one of these rings was attached the grip itself, an iron claw, to the other numerous ropes, which drew it by machine power after it had been thrown by a catapult and had seized the enemy's ships."

The harpax had a distinct advantage over the traditional naval boarding device, the corvus, in that it was much lighter. The corvus boarding bridge is estimated to have weighed a ton. The harpax could be thrown long distances due its light weight. It was discharged by a ballista as if it were a heavy dart. Furthermore, the harpax was composed of iron bands that could not be cut, and the ropes could not be cut due to the length of the iron grapple. Appian notes "As this apparatus had never been known before, the enemy had not provided themselves with scythe-mounted poles."

The casualty totals provide a broad picture of the tool's effectiveness: Sextus lost 180 of a total force of 300 warships - 28 by ramming and 155 by capture and by fire.

== See also ==
- Harpe
