= Naulochus (Ionia) =

Ancient Greek city in modern Turkey

Coordinates: 37°38′21″N 27°14′46″E

Naulochus or Naulochos (Ancient Greek: Ναύλοχος), also Naulochum or Naulochon (Ναύλοχον), was a town of ancient Ionia. It was supposed to be the port of Priene but perhaps it was an autonomous city at least during part of the fourth century BCE, since bronze coins from that century attributed to Naulochus have been preserved, where the legend «ΝΑΥ» appears. In a decree of Alexander the Great of the year 334 BCE, the inhabitants of Priene were granted freedom and certain privileges to reside in Naulochus. A theorodokos of Naulochus is also appointed to receive the theoros of Argos around the year 330 BCE, which again seems to be a sign of certain political autonomy but nevertheless the possibility has been pointed out that in fact the invitation to the games was made in the port to transmit it to the interior, where Priene was, to avoid loss of time of the envoy.

Its site is tentatively located near Atburgazı, Aydın Province, Turkey.
