= Socii navales =

Roman allies that provided naval support

Socii navales or "naval allies", were a class of the socii or foederati (allies) of Rome, that provided naval support. A large number of them were Greek cities in Sicily and mainland Greece. They were often used to augment the main fleet, often with lighter ships that the Romans or their adversaries had, such as triremes or pentekonters. The number of ships provided by the socii navales is disputed, with some saying that by 260 BC 42 ships were being supplied however others agree that by 210 BC only 12 were supplied, and that by 195 BC 25 ships were being supplied. The men provided by the socii navales were sailors and rowers.

== Known Socii Navales ==
- Cumae
