= Naulochus =

Ancient city in Sicily

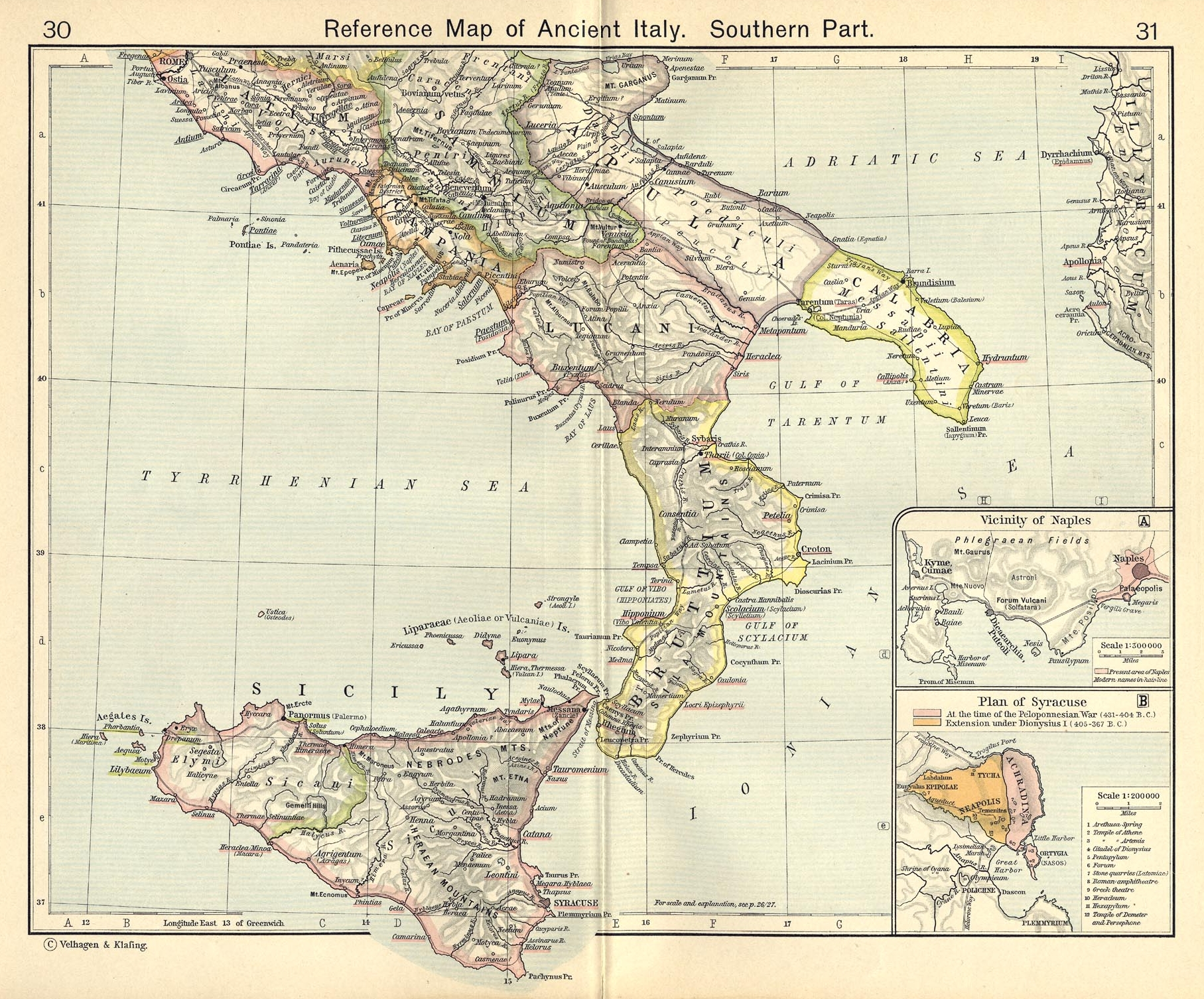
Map of ancient Sicily

Naulochus, Naulochos, Naulochoi, or Naulocha (Italian: Nauloco; Greek: Ναύλοχος in Silius Italicus, Ναύλοχοι in Suetonius, Ναύλοχα in Appian, meaning safe ship-sheltering), was an ancient city of Magna Graecia on the north coast of Sicily, between Mylae (modern Milazzo) and Cape Pelorus. It is known primarily from the great sea-fight in which Sextus Pompeius was defeated by Marcus Vipsanius Agrippa, 36 BCE, and which was fought between Mylae and Naulochus. (Suet. Aug. 16; Appian, B.C. v. 116-22.) Pompeius himself during the battle had been encamped with his land forces at Naulochus (Appian l. c. 121), and after his victory, Octavian, in his turn, took up his station there, while Agrippa and Lepidus advanced to attack Messana (modern Messina). (Id. 122.) It is clear from its name that Naulochus was a place where there was a good roadstead or anchorage for shipping. Some have doubted its existence as a populated place, but Silius Italicus includes it in his list of Sicilian cities. (Sil. Ital. xiv. 264.) From the description in Appian it is clear that it was situated between Mylae and Cape Rasoculmo (the Phalacrian Promontory of Ptolemy), and probably not very far from the latter point; but there is nothing to fix its site more definitely. The editors of the Barrington Atlas of the Greek and Roman World place it near the modern comune of Spadafora.
