= Battle of Naulochus =

36 BC naval battle off Sicily

- Part of the Sicilian revolt
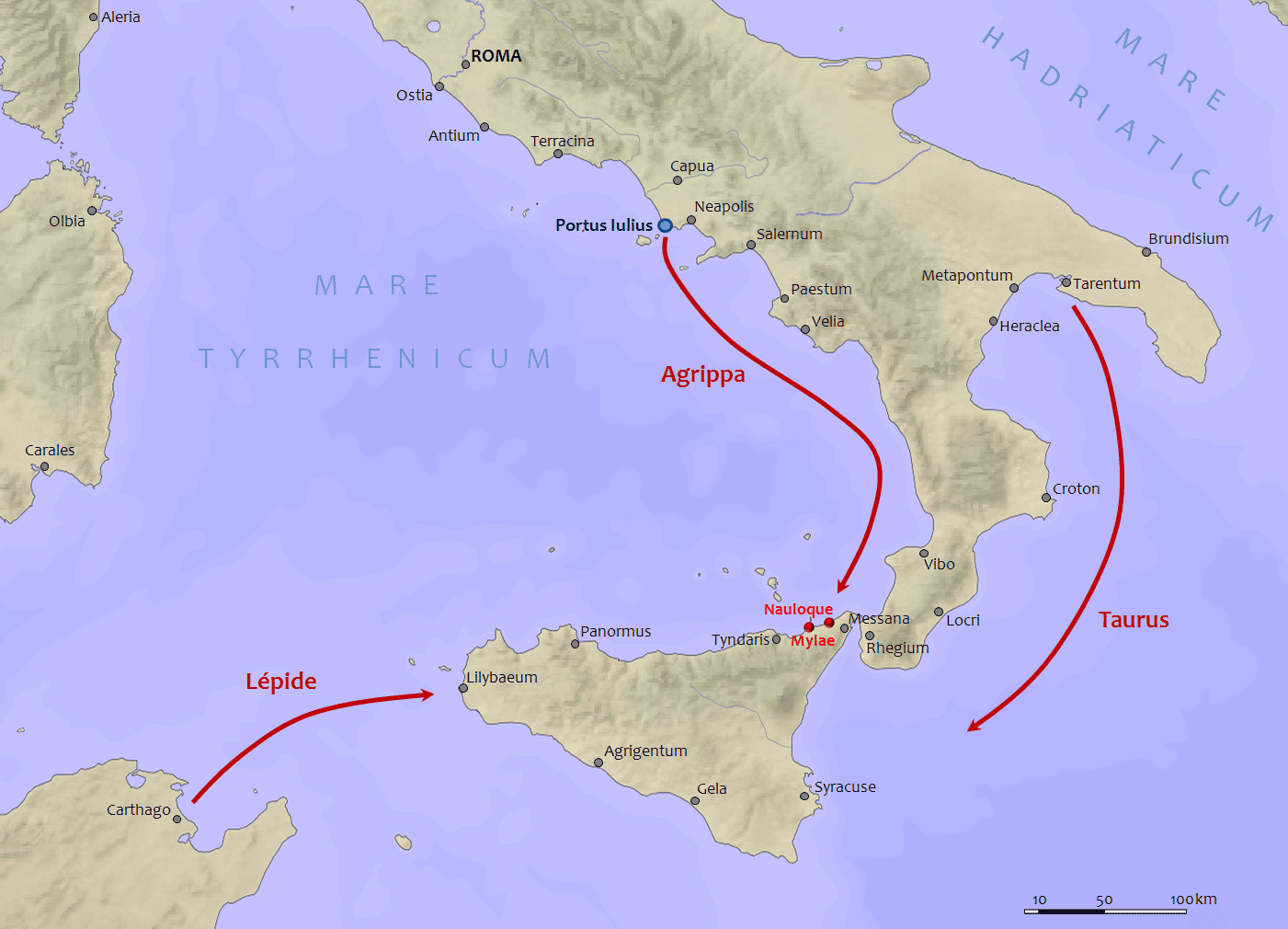
- Plan of offensive of Sicily of Augustus and Agrippa against Sextus Pompeius in 36 BC
Date	September 3, 36 BC
Location	off Naulochus, Sicily 38°16′30″N 15°27′00″E
Result	Octavian's victory

Belligerents
Pompeians	Octavian

Commanders and leaders
Sextus Pompey	Marcus Vipsanius Agrippa

Strength
300 ships	300 ships

Casualties and losses
28 ships sunk 17 fled the others captured	3 ships

The naval Battle of Naulochus was fought on 3 September 36 BC between the fleets of Sextus Pompeius and Marcus Vipsanius Agrippa, off Naulochus, Sicily. The victory of Agrippa, admiral of Octavian, marked the end of the Pompeian resistance to the Second Triumvirate.

== Background ==
After the strengthening of the bond between Octavian and Mark Antony with the Pact of Brundisium, the two triumvirs had to manage the menace of Sextus Pompey, son of Pompey. Sextus had occupied the province of Sicily, which provided much of Rome's grain supply. When Sextus had managed to bring famine to Rome, in 39 BC, Octavian and Antony sought an alliance with him, appointing him governor of Sicily, Sardinia, and the Peloponnese for five years (Treaty of Misenum). The alliance was short-lived, and Sextus cut the grain supply to Rome. Octavian tried to invade Sicily in 38 BC, but his ships were forced to go back because of bad weather.

Agrippa cut through part of the Via Ercolana and dug a channel to connect Lake Lucrinus to the sea in order to change it into a harbor. Additionally, Agrippa dug a second, longer, channel on the northern side of Lake Lucrinus to connect it to Lake Avernus, a marshy lake further inland, creating a multi-tiered port complex that was not visible from the outer bay, where Sextus's ships routinely patrolled. Agrippa named this harbor Portus Julius, or Iulius, after Octavian's assassinated great-uncle, Dictator Gaius Julius Caesar. The new harbor was used to specially outfit ships and secretly train men for naval battles. A new fleet was built, with 20,000 oarsmen gathered by freeing slaves. The new ships were built much larger, in order to carry many more naval infantry units. Furthermore, Antony lent Octavian 120 ships under the command of Titus Statilius Taurus, for which Octavian was to give him 20,000 infantry to be recruited from northern Italy. While Antony kept his part of the bargain, Octavian did not. In July 36 BC the two fleets sailed from Italy, and another fleet, provided by the third triumvir, Marcus Aemilius Lepidus, sailed from Africa, to attack Sextus's stronghold in Sicily. In August, Agrippa was able to defeat Sextus in a naval battle near Mylae (modern Milazzo); that same month, Octavian was defeated and seriously wounded in a battle near Taormina.

== Battle ==
In front of Naulochus promontory, Agrippa met Sextus's fleet. Both fleets were composed of 300 ships, all with artillery, but Agrippa commanded heavier units, armed with the harpax, a newer version of the corvus, that was invented by Agrippa himself. Agrippa used his new weapon to great effect, succeeding in blocking the more maneuverable ships of Sextus and, after a long and bloody fight, in defeating his enemy. Agrippa lost three ships, while 28 ships of Sextus were sunk, 17 fled, and the others were burnt or captured.

== Aftermath ==
After seven years, Sicily was finally wrested from the control of the resourceful Sextus, whose large navy had created many problems for the Second Triumvirate. Sextus reached Messina with seven ships and moved to Mytilene, then from there to the east, where he was defeated in 35 BC by Antony. Octavian and Lepidus defeated the last Pompeian resistance in Sicily. Later, after a good amount of intrigue, Octavian was able to strip Lepidus of his political and military power and become the sole ruler of the west.
