= Classis Britannica =

Provincial naval fleet of ancient Rome

The Classis Britannica (literally, British fleet, in the sense of 'the fleet in British waters' or 'the fleet of the province of Britannia', rather than 'the fleet of the state of Britain') was a provincial naval fleet of the navy of ancient Rome. Its purpose was to control the English Channel and the waters around the Roman province of Britannia. Unlike modern (and some contemporary Roman) "fighting navies", its job was largely the logistical movement of personnel and support, and keeping open communication routes across the Channel.

There is no literary reference in the classical historians to the Classis Britannica by that name, and archaeological evidence is also tantalizingly scant (although tiles stamped CLBR are common along the east Kent coast and in London, suggesting either government buildings or an early instance of army surplus), meaning that details of its history and form are unfortunately based on a large degree of interpretation.

== History ==
=== Invasion ===
A fleet was originally raised for the invasion of Britain under Claudius, with the task of bringing an invasion force of 40,000 men from the Roman army, plus supplies, to Great Britain. It continued after the successful invasion to provide support for the army, shuttling massive quantities of supplies across the English Channel.

=== Conquest ===
This fleet played a major role in the subsequent conquest of Britannia. However, Tacitus states that strangely, about twenty years after the invasion, it was not present at Suetonius Paulinus's crossing of the Menai Strait to Anglesey (also known as Ynys Môn) before the Boudican Rebellion. This suggests the force was still occupied in the Channel area, unsuitable to the long voyage up to the north of Wales, or too small by then to offer any useful level of support to the ground troops.

In the Flavian period what had been raised initially as a temporary invasion fleet was formalised as the Classis Britannica and made permanent in statute. Also in the Flavian period, under the governor Agricola, it circumnavigated Caledonia (Scotland), and in 83 attacked its eastern coast. One year later the fleet is recorded as having reached the Orkney Islands.

Due to the lack of serious naval opposition in the early Imperial period in the area of the fleet's operations – the invasion crossing, for example, went navally uncontested – the Classis's main role was as logistical support both to the army in Britannia, and also to armies campaigning in later years in Germania.

=== Iron production ===
In the Weald of south-east England stamped tiles of the Classis Britannica have been found at sites associated with the production of iron. The largest of these is at Beauport Park, near Battle, East Sussex, where more than 1000 tiles were used to roof a substantial bath house adjacent to a large iron smelting site. Other iron production sites where tiles have been found are at Bardown, near Wadhurst, Sussex, and Little Farningham Farm, near Cranbrook, Kent. Three other sites where tiles have been found had access to navigable water in Roman times, and two of them, at Bodiam, and at Boreham Bridge near Ninfield, both in Sussex have associated ironworks. The implication is that the Classis Britannica not only transported iron but was involved in its production as well.

=== Hiatus ===
The fleet disappears from the archaeological record towards the middle of the 3rd century but is known from contemporary sources to have continued in existence after this date.

=== Carausius ===
In 286, Carausius, a Roman military commander of Gaulish origins, was appointed to command the Classis Britannica, and given the responsibility of eliminating Frankish and Saxon pirates who had been raiding the coasts of Armorica and Belgic Gaul. However, he was suspected of keeping captured treasure for himself, and even of allowing the pirates to carry out raids and enrich themselves before taking action against them, and Maximian ordered his execution.

In late 286 or early 287 he learned of this sentence and responded by usurping power and declaring himself emperor of Britannia and northern Gaul. When the British fleet was attacked by a Rhine fleet representing the Roman Empire, the British fleet was victorious, showing that it must have been substantial at the time. The would-be invaders, however, blamed poor weather for their defeat.

By 300, however, Britannia was once again a part of the larger Roman Empire, and the Classis Britannica restored as a Roman imperial fleet.

=== End of empire ===
In the final years of Roman Britain, the fleet was devoted almost entirely to protecting the Eastern and Southern coasts of Great Britain against first piratic actions and, shortly before the withdrawal of troops from Britain, against Saxon raids against coastal towns and villages on what came to be known as the Saxon Shore. The fleet probably had some role in the operation of the Saxon Shore forts.

== Ports and harbours ==
It was originally believed that the main base of the fleet was in Rutupiae (Richborough) but more recent archaeological work has uncovered one of only three surviving forts occupied by the fleet's marines at Dubris (Dover), suggesting this was in fact a major base of the Classis. It may even have been its primary base, though one of the other surviving fleet forts, at Boulogne-sur-Mer, is far larger and thus said by some to be a more likely contender than Dover for that role. Portus Adurni (which was later adapted and known as Portchester Castle) at the north of Portsmouth harbour is another contender and believed to have been at the very least a major base for the fleet.
