= Delphic maxims =

Set of maxims inscribed on the Temple of Apollo at Delphi

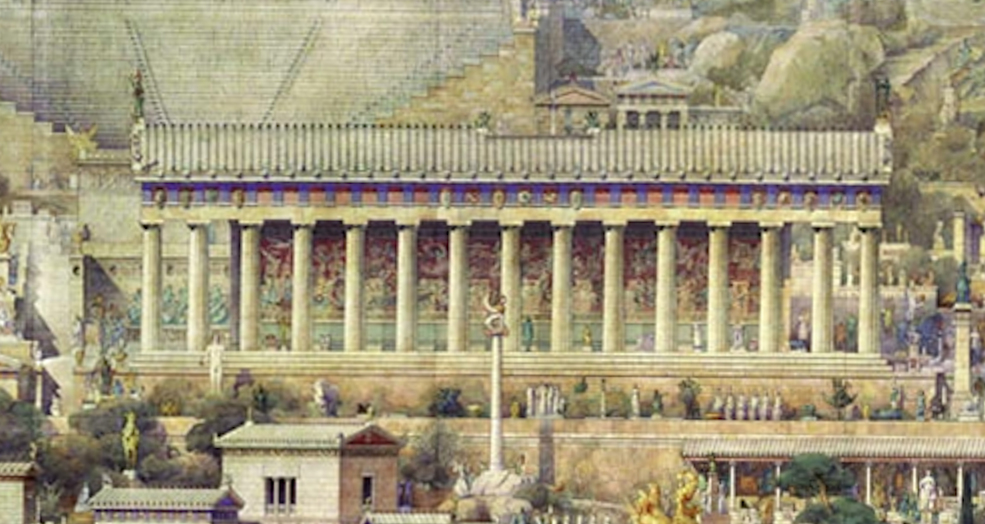
Temple of Apollo at Delphi, by Albert Tournaire

The Delphic maxims are a set of moral precepts that were inscribed on the Temple of Apollo in the ancient Greek precinct of Delphi. The three best known maxims – "Know thyself", "Nothing in excess", and "Surety is ruin" – were prominently located at the entrance to the temple, and were traditionally said to have been authored by the legendary Seven Sages of Greece, or even by Apollo. In fact, they are more likely to have simply been popular proverbs. Each maxim has a long history of interpretation, although the third of the set has received comparatively little attention.

A further 147 maxims, documented by Stobaeus in the 5th century AD, were also located somewhere in the vicinity of the temple. The antiquity and authenticity of these maxims was once in doubt, but recent archaeological discoveries have confirmed that some of the sayings quoted by Stobaeus were current as early as the 3rd century BCE.

== Entrance maxims ==
Three maxims are known to have been inscribed on the Temple of Apollo at Delphi at least as early as the 5th century BCE, and possibly earlier. These inscriptions are routinely referenced and discussed by ancient authors; Plato, for example, mentions them in six of his dialogues. (Note: Benjamin Jowett's index to his translation of the Dialogues of Plato lists six dialogues which mention the Delphic inscriptions: Charmides (164D), Protagoras (343B), Phaedrus (229E), Philebus (45E, 48C), Laws (11.923A), Alcibiades I (124B, 129A, 132C).) Their exact location is uncertain; they are variously stated to have been on the wall of the pronaos (forecourt), on a column, on a doorpost, on the temple front, or on the propylaea (gateway).

Although the temple was destroyed and rebuilt several times over the years, the maxims appear to have persisted into the Roman era (1st century AD), at which time, according to Pliny the Elder, they were written in letters of gold.

The maxims are as follows:

No.	Greek	Romanized transliteration	English
001	Γνῶθι σεαυτόν	Gnôthi seautón (or se autón)	Know thyself
002	Μηδὲν ἄγαν	Mēdèn ágan	Nothing in excess
003	Ἐγγύα πάρα δ' Ἄτα	Engúa pára d' Áta	Give a pledge and trouble is at hand

These sayings were traditionally said to have originated with the Seven Sages, a legendary group of philosophers and statesmen who flourished in the 6th century BCE. The first known reference to the Seven Sages is in Plato's Protagoras, where they are said to have collectively authored the first two maxims. The names of the sages are given by Plato as Thales, Pittacus, Bias, Solon, Cleobulus, Myson and Chilon; but in the works of later writers, some of these names are dropped and others added in their place. Each of the maxims was often attributed to a particular sage, and some authors, such as Demetrius of Phalerum, assigned additional sayings to the four remaining sages. There was no general agreement over which maxim belonged to which sage, but "Know thyself" was most commonly attributed to Chilon.

Another popular theory held that the maxims were first spoken by the Delphic oracle, and therefore represented the wisdom of the god Apollo. Clearchus of Soli, among others, attempted to reconcile the two accounts by claiming that Chilon, enquiring of the oracle what was best to be learnt, received the answer "Know thyself", and subsequently adopted the maxim as his own. In all likelihood, however, the sayings were simply common proverbs of much earlier date, which gained a new significance from their prominent position on the temple.

=== First maxim ===
The first maxim, "know thyself", has been called "by far the most significant of the three maxims, both in ancient and modern times". In its earliest appearances in ancient literature, it was interpreted to mean that one should understand one's strengths and limitations and know one's place in the social scale (which can be interpreted as not allowing oneself to be demeaned, treated as lower or worse than one is). The first application of the phrase to self-knowledge in the modern sense occurs in Plato's Phaedrus, in which Socrates says that he has no leisure to investigate the truth behind common mythological beliefs while he has not yet discovered the truth about his own nature. Many authors throughout history have considered knowledge of the self to involve knowledge of other people, knowledge of the universe, and/or knowledge of God; consequently, alongside its metaphysical, self-reflexive sense, the maxim has been applied in a host of different ways to problems of science, ethics, and theology.

=== Second maxim ===
In ancient Greece, the maxim "nothing too much" was only rarely understood to mean that one should place limits on one's physical appetites, being far more commonly invoked as a reminder to avoid excessive emotion, particularly excessive grief. It was also quoted by ancient authors as a warning against pride, and considering its placement at the entrance to the temple, it may have been intended to convey that "man is not to exalt himself even in his piety"; in other words, that one should not make lavish sacrifices to the gods, but should humbly give what one can spare.

The maxim has been said to have received its "ultimate expression" in Aristotle's theory of ethics, according to which every classical virtue occupies a middle place between the two extremes of excess and deficiency. It is uncertain, however, whether the maxim was a direct influence on Aristotle, as it is not explicitly referenced in his Nicomachean Ethics (although it does occur twice in another of his works, the Rhetoric). Several other phrases of similar import were current among Greek writers, such as "The half is more than the whole" and "Due measure is best", both of which are found in Hesiod's Works and Days (c. 700 BC).

Interest in "nothing too much" dropped off during the medieval era, but it was frequently cited in the literature of the 16th and 17th centuries (often in its Latin form, ne quid nimis). From this time onward, the rule of moderation enjoined by the maxim has been more frequently applied to physical pleasures than to emotional states. In John Milton's Paradise Lost, for example, the archangel Michael advises Adam to "observe the rule of not too much ... in what thou eat'st and drink'st, seeking from thence due nourishment, not gluttonous delight".

Some authors, such as 16th-century humanist Sperone Speroni, have criticized the maxim for its apparent endorsement of mediocrity. Such criticism may be traced back as far as Pindar (5th century BCE), who claimed that the philosophers of his day were excessive in their praise of the Delphic saying. Similarly, 20th‑century essayist Paul Elmer More has argued that a too-rigorous adherence to the principle of moderation may have been the downfall of ancient Greek civilization.

=== Third maxim ===
The third maxim, "give a pledge and trouble is at hand", has been variously interpreted. The Greek word ἐγγύα, here translated "pledge", can mean either (a) surety given for a loan; (b) a binding oath given during a marriage ceremony; or (c) a strong affirmation of any kind. Accordingly, the maxim may be a warning against any one of these things.

The correct interpretation of the maxim was being debated as early as the 1st century BCE, when Diodorus Siculus discussed the question in his Bibliotheca historica. In Plutarch's Septem sapientium convivium, the ambiguity of the phrase is said to have "kept many from marrying, and many from trusting, and some even from speaking". Diogenes Laërtius (3rd century AD) also makes reference to the maxim in his account of the life of Pyrrho, the founder of Pyrrhonism. Exploring the origins of the Pyrrhonean doctrine of philosophical skepticism, Diogenes claims that the Delphic maxims are skeptical in nature, and interprets the third maxim to mean: "Trouble attends him who affirms anything in strong terms and confidently".

Analysing the various appearances of the maxim in Greek literature, Eliza Wilkins finds the opinion of the ancient authors on the meaning of ἐγγύα split between the two rival interpretations of "commit yourself emphatically" and "become surety". Among Latin authors, however, the maxim is universally interpreted in the latter sense, as advice against giving surety.

== 147 maxims of Stobaeus ==
In the 5th-century-AD anthology of Stobaeus, there is a list of a further 147 maxims attributed to the Seven Sages of Greece.

List of maxims:
No.	Greek	Romanized transliteration	English (Note: As translated by A. N. Oikonomides, who warns that his translations must be taken as "provisional", since "these thought provoking brief commandments are by no means the type of text that can be assigned easily as having one meaning.")
001	Ἕπου θεῷ	Hépou theôi	Follow the gods
002	Νόμῳ πείθου	Nómōi peíthou	Obey the law
003	Θεοὺς σέβου	Theoùs sébou	Worship the gods
004	Γονεῖς αἰδοῦ	Goneîs aidoû	Respect your parents
005	Ἡττῶ ὑπὸ δικαίου	Hēttô hupò dikaíou	Be overcome by justice
006	Γνῶθι μαθών	Gnôthi mathṓn	Know what you have learned
007	Ἀκούσας νόει	Akoúsas nóei	Perceive what you have heard
008	Σαυτὸν ἴσθι	Sautòn ísthi	Be yourself
009	Γαμεῖν μέλλε	Gameîn mélle	Intend to get married
010	Καιρὸν γνῶθι	Kairòn gnôthi	Know your opportunity
011	Φρόνει θνητά	Phrónei thnētá	Think as a mortal
012	Ξένος ὢν ἴσθι	Xénos ṑn ísthi	If you are a stranger act like one
013	Ἑστίαν τίμα	Hestían tíma	Honour the hearth (or Hestia)
014	Ἄρχε σεαυτοῦ	Árkhe seautoû	Control yourself
015	Φίλοις βοήθει	Phílois boḗthei	Help your friends
016	Θυμοῦ κράτει	Thumoû krátei	Control anger
017	Φρόνησιν ἄσκει	Phrónēsin áskei	Exercise prudence
018	Πρόνοιαν τίμα	Prónoian tíma	Honour providence
019	Ὅρκῳ μὴ χρῶ	Hórkōi mḕ khrô	Do not use an oath
020	Φιλίαν ἀγάπα	Philían agápa	Love friendship
021	Παιδείας ἀντέχου	Paideías antékhou	Cling to discipline
022	Δόξαν δίωκε	Dóxan díōke	Pursue honour
023	Σοφίαν ζήλου	Sophían zḗlou	Long for wisdom
024	Καλὸν εὖ λέγε	Kalòn eû lége	Praise the good
025	Ψέγε μηδένα	Psége mēdéna	Find fault with no one
026	Ἐπαίνει ἀρετήν	Epaínei aretḗn	Praise virtue
027	Πρᾶττε δίκαια	Prâtte díkaia	Practice what is just
028	Φίλοις εὐνόει	Phílois eunóei	Be kind to your friends
029	Ἐχθροὺς ἀμύνου	Ekhthroùs amúnou	Watch out for your enemies
030	Εὐγένειαν ἄσκει	Eugéneian áskei	Exercise nobility of character
031	Κακίας ἀπέχου	Kakías apékhou	Shun evil
032	Κοινὸς γίνου	Koinòs gínou	Be sociable
033	Ἴδια φύλαττε	Ídia phúlatte	Guard what is yours
034	Ἀλλοτρίων ἀπέχου	Allotríōn apékhou	Shun what belongs to others
035	Ἄκουε πάντα	Ákoue pánta	Listen to everyone
036	Εὔφημος ἴσθι	Eúphēmos ísthi	Be (religiously) silent
037	Φίλῳ χαρίζου	Phílōi kharízou	Do a favour for a friend
038	Μηδὲν ἄγαν	Mēdèn ágan	Nothing to excess
039	Χρόνου φείδου	Khrónou pheídou	Use time sparingly
040	Ὅρα τὸ μέλλον	Hóra tò méllon	Foresee the future
041	Ὕβριν μίσει	Húbrin mísei	Despise insolence
042	Ἱκέτας αἰδοῦ	Hikétas aidoû	Have respect for suppliants
043	Πᾶσιν ἁρμόζου	Pâsin harmózou	Be accommodated in everything
044	Υἱοὺς παίδευε	Huioùs paídeue	Educate your sons
045	Ἔχων χαρίζου	Ékhōn kharízou	Give what you have
046	Δόλον φοβοῦ	Dólon phoboû	Fear deceit
047	Εὐλόγει πάντας	Eulógei pántas	Speak well of everyone
048	Φιλόσοφος γίνου	Philósophos gínou	Be a seeker of wisdom
049	Ὅσια κρῖνε	Hósia krîne	Choose what is divine
050	Γνοὺς πρᾶττε	Gnoùs prâtte	Act when you know
051	Φόνου ἀπέχου	Phónou apékhou	Shun murder
052	Εὔχου δυνατά	Eúkhou dunatá	Pray for things possible
053	Σοφοῖς χρῶ	Sophoîs khrô	Consult the wise
054	Ἦθος δοκίμαζε	Êthos dokímaze	Test the character
055	Λαβὼν ἀπόδος	Labṑn apódos	Give back what you have received
056	Ὑφορῶ μηδένα	Huphorô mēdéna	Look down on no one
057	Τέχνῃ χρῶ	Tékhnēi khrô	Use your skill
058	Ὃ μέλλεις, δός	Hò mélleis, dós	Do what you mean to do
059	Εὐεργεσίας τίμα	Euergesías tíma	Honour a benefaction
060	Φθόνει μηδενί	Phthónei mēdení	Be jealous of no one
061	Φυλακῇ πρόσεχε	Phulakêi prósekhe	Be on your guard
062	Ἐλπίδα αἴνει	Elpída aínei	Praise hope
063	Διαβολὴν μίσει	Diabolḕn mísei	Despise a slanderer
064	Δικαίως κτῶ	Dikaíōs ktô	Gain possessions justly
065	Ἀγαθοὺς τίμα	Agathoùs tíma	Honour good men
066	Κριτὴν γνῶθι	Kritḕn gnôthi	Know the judge
067	Γάμους κράτει	Gámous krátei	Master wedding-feasts
068	Τύχην νόμιζε	Túkhēn nómize	Recognize fortune
069	Ἐγγύην φεῦγε	Engúēn pheûge	Flee a pledge
070	Ἁπλῶς διαλέγου	Haplôs dialégou	Speak plainly
071	Ὁμοίοις χρῶ	Homoíois khrô	Associate with your peers
072	Δαπανῶν ἄρχου	Dapanôn árkhou	Govern your expenses
073	Κτώμενος ἥδου	Ktṓmenos hḗdou	Be happy with what you have
074	Αἰσχύνην σέβου	Aiskhúnēn sébou	Revere a sense of shame
075	Χάριν ἐκτέλει	Khárin ektélei	Fulfill a favour
076	Εὐτυχίαν εὔχου	Eutukhían eúkhou	Pray for happiness
077	Τύχην στέργε	Túkhēn stérge	Be fond of fortune
078	Ἀκούων ὅρα	Akoúōn hóra	Observe what you have heard
079	Ἐργάζου κτητά	Ergázou ktētá	Work for what you can own
080	Ἔριν μίσει	Érin mísei	Despise strife
081	Ὄνειδος ἔχθαιρε	Óneidos ékhthaire	Detest disgrace
082	Γλῶτταν ἴσχε	Glôttan ískhe	Restrain the tongue
083	Ὕβριν ἀμύνου	Húbrin amúnou	Keep yourself from insolence
084	Κρῖνε δίκαια	Krîne díkaia	Make just judgements
085	Χρῶ χρήμασιν	Khrô khrḗmasin	Use what you have
086	Ἀδωροδόκητος δίκαζε	Adōrodókētos díkaze	Judge incorruptibly
087	Αἰτιῶ παρόντα	Aitiô parónta	Accuse one who is present
088	Λέγε εἰδώς	Lége eidṓs	Tell when you know
089	Βίας μὴ ἔχου	Bías mḕ ékhou	Do not depend on strength
090	Ἀλύπως βίου	Alúpōs bíou	Live without sorrow
091	Ὁμίλει πρᾴως	Homílei prā́iōs	Live together meekly
092	Πέρας ἐπιτέλει μὴ ἀποδειλιῶν	Péras epitélei mḕ apodeiliôn	Finish the race without shrinking back
093	Φιλοφρόνει πᾶσιν	Philophrónei pâsin	Deal kindly with everyone
094	Υἱοῖς μὴ καταρῶ	Huioîs mḕ katarô	Do not curse your sons
095	Γυναικὸς ἄρχε	Gunaikòs árkhe	Rule your wife
096	Σεαυτὸν εὖ ποίει	Seautòn eû poíei	Benefit yourself
097	Εὐπροσήγορος γίνου	Euprosḗgoros gínou	Be courteous
098	Ἀποκρίνου ἐν καιρῷ	Apokrínou en kairôi	Give a timely response
099	Πόνει μετ’ εὐκλείας	Pónei met’ eukleías	Struggle with glory
100	Πρᾶττε ἀμετανοήτως	Prâtte ametanoḗtōs	Act without repenting
101	Ἁμαρτάνων μετανόει	Hamartánōn metanóei	Repent of sins
102	Ὀφθαλμοῦ κράτει	Ophthalmoû krátei	Control the eye
103	Βουλεύου χρόνῳ	Bouleúou khrónōi	Give a timely counsel
104	Πρᾶττε συντόμως	Prâtte suntómōs	Act quickly
105	Φιλίαν φύλαττε	Philían phúlatte	Guard friendship
106	Εὐγνώμων γίνου	Eugnṓmōn gínou	Be grateful
107	Ὁμόνοιαν δίωκε	Homónoian díōke	Pursue harmony
108	Ἄρρητον κρύπτε	Árrhēton krúpte	Keep deeply the top secret
109	Τὸ κρατοῦν φοβοῦ	Tò kratoûn phoboû	Fear ruling
110	Τὸ συμφέρον θηρῶ	Tò sumphéron thērô	Pursue what is profitable
111	Καιρὸν προσδέχου	Kairòn prosdékhou	Accept due measure
112	Ἔχθρας διάλυε	Ékhthras diálue	Do away with enmities
113	Γῆρας προσδέχου	Gêras prosdékhou	Accept old age
114	Ἐπὶ ῥώμῃ μὴ καυχῶ	Epì rhṓmēi mḕ kaukhô	Do not boast in might
115	Εὐφημίαν ἄσκει	Euphēmían áskei	Exercise (religious) silence
116	Ἀπέχθειαν φεῦγε	Apékhtheian pheûge	Flee enmity
117	Πλούτει δικαίως	Ploútei dikaíōs	Acquire wealth justly
118	Δόξαν μὴ λεῖπε	Dóxan mḕ leîpe	Do not abandon honour
119	Κακίαν μίσει	Kakían mísei	Despise evil
120	Κινδύνευε φρονίμως	Kindúneue phronímōs	Venture into danger prudently
121	Μανθάνων μὴ κάμνε	Manthánōn mḕ kámne	Do not tire of learning
122	Φειδόμενος μὴ λεῖπε	Pheidómenos mḕ leîpe	Do not stop to be thrifty
123	Χρησμοὺς θαύμαζε	Khrēsmoùs thaúmaze	Admire oracles
124	Οὓς τρέφεις, ἀγάπα	Hoùs trépheis, agápa	Love whom you rear
125	Ἀπόντι μὴ μάχου	Apónti mḕ mákhou	Do not oppose someone absent
126	Πρεσβύτερον αἰδοῦ	Presbúteron aidoû	Respect an elder
127	Νεώτερον δίδασκε	Neṓteron dídaske	Teach a youngster
128	Πλούτῳ ἀπίστει	Ploútōi apístei	Do not trust wealth
129	Σεαυτὸν αἰδοῦ	Seautòn aidoû	Respect yourself
130	Μὴ ἄρχε ὑβρίζειν	Mḕ árkhe hubrízein	Do not begin to be insolent
131	Προγόνους στεφάνου	Progónous stephánou	Crown your ancestors
132	Θνῆσκε ὑπὲρ πατρίδος	Thnêske hupèr patrídos	Die for your country
133	Τῷ βίῳ μὴ ἄχθου	Tôi bíōi mḕ ákhthou	Do not be discontented by life
134	Ἐπὶ νεκρῷ μὴ γέλα	Epì nekrôi mḕ géla	Do not make fun of the dead
135	Ἀτυχοῦντι συνάχθου	Atukhoûnti sunákhthou	Share the load of the unfortunate
136	Χαρίζου ἀβλαβῶς	Kharízou ablabôs	Gratify without harming
137	Μὴ ἐπὶ παντὶ λυποῦ	Mḕ epì pantì lupoû	Grieve for no one
138	Ἐξ εὐγενῶν γέννα	Ex eugenôn génna	Beget from noble routes
139	Ἐπαγγέλλου μηδενί	Epangéllou mēdení	Make promises to no one
140	Φθιμένους μὴ ἀδίκει	Phthiménous mḕ adíkei	Do not wrong the dead
141	Εὖ πάσχε ὡς θνητός	Eû páskhe hōs thnētós	Be well off as a mortal
142	Τύχῃ μὴ πίστευε	Túkhēi mḕ písteue	Do not trust fortune
143	Παῖς ὢν κόσμιος ἴσθι	Paîs ṑn kósmios ísthi	As a child be well-behaved
144	Ἡβῶν ἐγκρατής	Hēbôn enkratḗs	As a youth—self-disciplined
145	Μέσος δίκαιος	Mésos díkaios	As of middle-aged—just
146	Πρεσβύτης εὔλογος	Presbútēs eúlogos	As an old man—sensible
147	Τελευτῶν ἄλυπος	Teleutôn álupos	On reaching the end—without sorrow

=== Archaeological evidence ===
Stobaeus cites a certain Sosiades as his source, but the identity of Sosiades is unknown, and it was once thought that this collection of maxims was of no great antiquity. In 1901, however, a parallel collection was discovered at Miletopolis in modern-day Turkey, inscribed on a stele dating from the 3rd or 4th century BCE. The stele is broken in two places; the surviving portion carries a list of 56 maxims which closely correspond to those given by Stobaeus, and it is probable that the original text contained all 147.

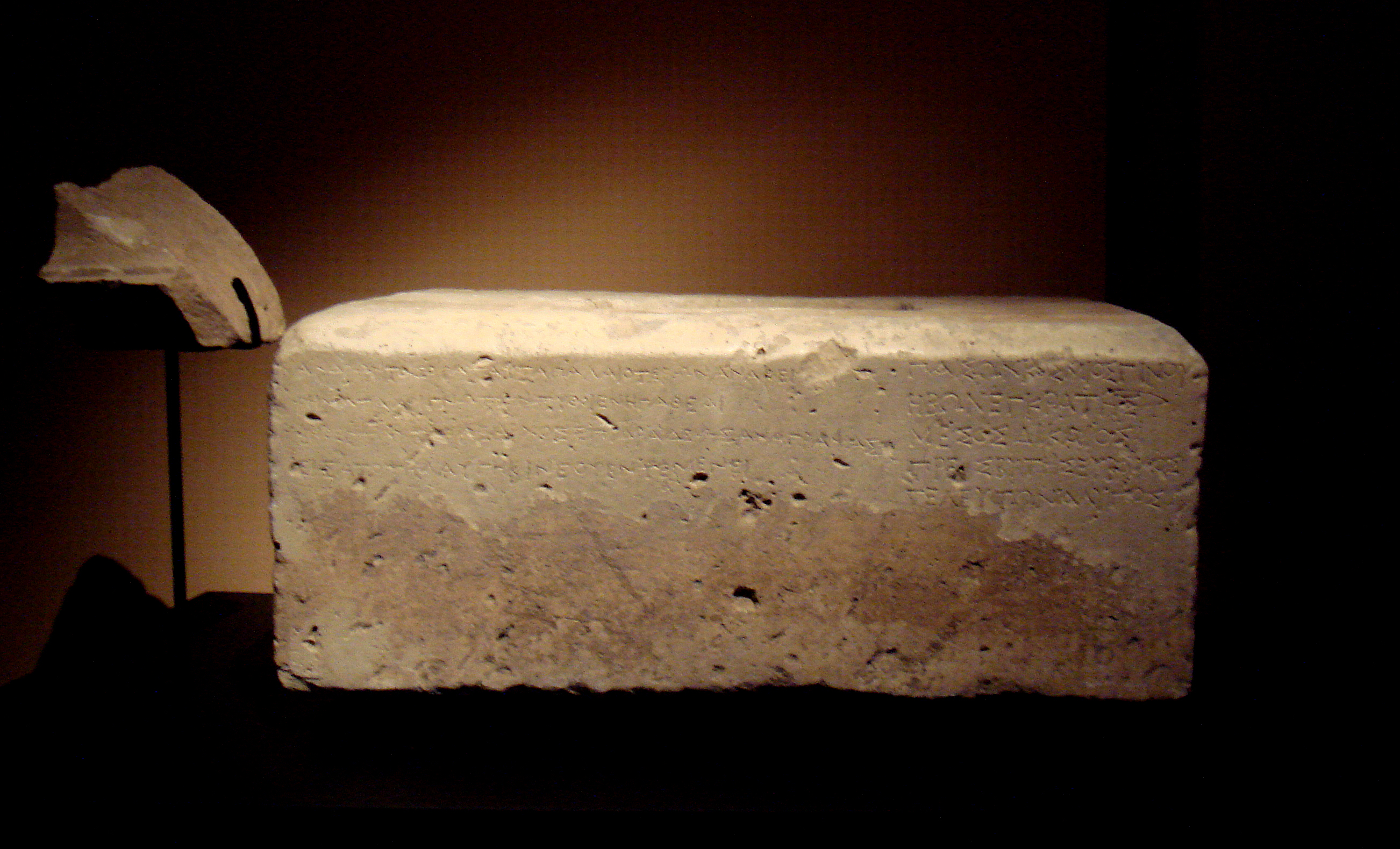
Inscription at Ai-Khanoum, 3rd century BCE

Another inscription, discovered in 1966 at Ai-Khanoum in modern-day Afghanistan, presents the final five maxims of Stobaeus, and reports that these maxims were originally found at "holy Pytho", i.e. Delphi. The inscription, dating from the 3rd century BCE, reads as follows:

ἀνδρῶν τοι σοφὰ ταῦτα παλαιοτέρων ἀνάκει[τα]ι ῥήματα ἀριγνώτων Πυθοὶ ἐν ἠγαθέαι· ἔνθεν ταῦτ[α] Κλέαρχος ἐπιφραδέως ἀναγράψας εἵσατο τηλαυγῆ Κινέου ἐν τεμένει.

παῖς ὢν κόσμιος γίνου,
ἡβῶν ἐγκρατής,
μέσος δίκαιος,
πρεσβύτης εὔβουλος,
τελευτῶν ἄλυπος.

Translation:

These wise sayings of men of former times, the words of famous men, are consecrated at holy Pytho; from there Klearchos (Note: The author of the inscription, "Klearchos", is often thought to be Aristotle's student, Clearchus of Soli, but this identification is unlikely.) copied them carefully, to set them up, shining afar, in the precinct of Kineas.

When a child, show yourself well-behaved;
When a young man, self controlled;
In middle age, just;
As an old man, a good counsellor;
At the end of your life, free from sorrow.

The stone which bears this inscription formed the base of a stele, and a small fragment of the stele itself survives. The legible text on the stele, as reconstructed by Louis Robert, reads "Ε[ὐλόγει πάντας], Φιλόσοφ[ος γίνου]", which corresponds to Stobaeus no. 47 and 48 ("Speak well of everyone; Be a seeker of wisdom"). Robert suggested that the stele and base together bore the full list of 147 maxims, with the final five having been appended to the base due to the stonecutter running out of room. On the evidence of these inscriptions, it is now regarded as certain that the sayings preserved by Stobaeus were once inscribed at Delphi, and that their influence was felt not only in Greece, but throughout the wider Hellenistic world.

== See also ==
- List of oracular statements from Delphi
- Golden Verses
- Via media
