= Cleobulina =

Ancient Greek poet

Cleobulina (Ancient Greek: Κλεοβουλίνη, Κλεοβουλήνη, 6th century BC) or Eumetis (Note: Plutarch says that her real name was Eumetis, though as this means "clever" in Greek this may be an invention by Plutarch or his source.) (Εὔμητις) was an ancient Greek poet. She was known for writing riddles, and three riddles attributed to her survive. Her existence has been debated.

== Life ==
According to Athenaeus and Diogenes Laërtius, Cleobulina came from Lindos on the island of Rhodes. She was the daughter of Cleobulus, one of the Seven Sages of Greece, and, in his The Dinner of the Seven Wise Men, Plutarch credits her with moderating her father's rule. The same author writes that as a young girl Cleobulina was a companion of the pre-Socratic philosopher Thales of Miletus, but according to Diogenes Laërtius she was his mother. If either association is accurate, Cleobulina must have been active at the beginning of the 6th century BC.

== Works ==
Riddles were already attributed to Cleobulina by the end of the fifth and the beginning of the fourth century BC, and Athenaeus mentions a treatise on them by the otherwise unknown Diotimus of Olympene. However, only three riddles frequently attributed to Cleobulina survive, besides a fourth more often attributed to her father. One was clearly well known in antiquity, as it was quoted twice by Aristotle, as well as by Plutarch, Demetrius of Phalerum, and Athenaeus. Another survives in quotation by an anonymous philosopher, and the third in Plutarch's Moralia. Two are elegiac couplets and the third is a single dactylic hexameter.

Athenaeus mentions and partially reproduces two ancient comedies that are attributed Cleobulina in his work. However, one of them was written by Cratinus, a writer of Old Comedy; it may have been produced between 451 and 450 BC, as Eusebius says that Cleobulina was especially renowned in that year. The other was by Menander's uncle and teacher, Alexis.

== Reception ==
The Suda has an entry about her, and in 1690 Gilles Ménage wrote a study about her. In 1706, Johann Caspar Eberti provided a list of sources and references. She is also referred to by Lucretia Marinelli (1601), Johann Frauenlob (1631), Johann Heinrich Hottinger (1655), Johannes Esberg (1700) und Johann Pasch (1701), in part under the name Eumetis.

Cleobulina appears in Judy Chicago's 1974-1979 installation The Dinner Party, where under the name of Cleobuline she is sat with other female artists and poets of antiquity next to Sappho.
