= Know thyself =

Ancient Greek maxim

"Know thyself" (Greek: Γνῶθι σεαυτόν, gnōthi seauton) (Note: Or, in its uncontracted form: Γνῶθι σεαυτόν, gnōthi se auton (see Crasis). In Latin works, the phrase is commonly translated nōsce tē ipsum.) is a philosophical Delphic maxim which was inscribed upon the Temple of Apollo in the ancient Greek precinct of Delphi. The best-known of the Delphic maxims, it has been quoted and analyzed by numerous authors throughout history, and has been applied in many ways. Although traditionally attributed to the Seven Sages of Greece, or to the god Apollo himself, the inscription likely had its origin in a popular proverb.

Ion of Chios makes the earliest explicit allusion to the maxim in a fragment dating to the 5th century BC, though the philosopher Heraclitus, active toward the end of the previous century, may also have made reference to the maxim in his works. The principal meaning of the phrase in its original application was "know your limits" – either in the sense of knowing the extent of one's abilities, knowing one's place in the world, or knowing oneself to be mortal. In the 4th century BC, however, the maxim was drastically reinterpreted by Plato, who understood it to mean, broadly speaking, "know your soul".

In later writings on the subject, one common theme was that one could acquire knowledge of the self by studying the universe, or knowledge of the universe by studying the self. This was often explained in terms of the microcosm–macrocosm analogy, the idea that a human being is structurally similar to the cosmos. Another theme, which can be traced back to the Platonic Alcibiades I, is that one can only know oneself by observing other people.

Christian, Jewish and Islamic authors found various scriptural equivalents for the maxim, allowing them to discuss the topic of self-knowledge without reference to the pagan inscription. By the time of the Protestant Reformation, Christian theologians generally understood the maxim to enjoin, firstly, knowledge of the soul's origin in God, and secondly, knowledge of the sinfulness of human nature. In secular writings of the period, several new meanings emerged; among them, that "know thyself" was a command to study the physical properties of the human body.

During the 19th and 20th centuries, the maxim acquired several new associations. It was frequently quoted in German philosophy and literature, by authors such as Kant, Hegel and Goethe; it was cited as an analogue of "tat tvam asi" ("that thou art"), one of the "Great Sayings" of Hinduism; and it took on an important role in the developing discipline of psychoanalysis, where it was interpreted as an injunction to understand the unconscious mind.

== Origin ==
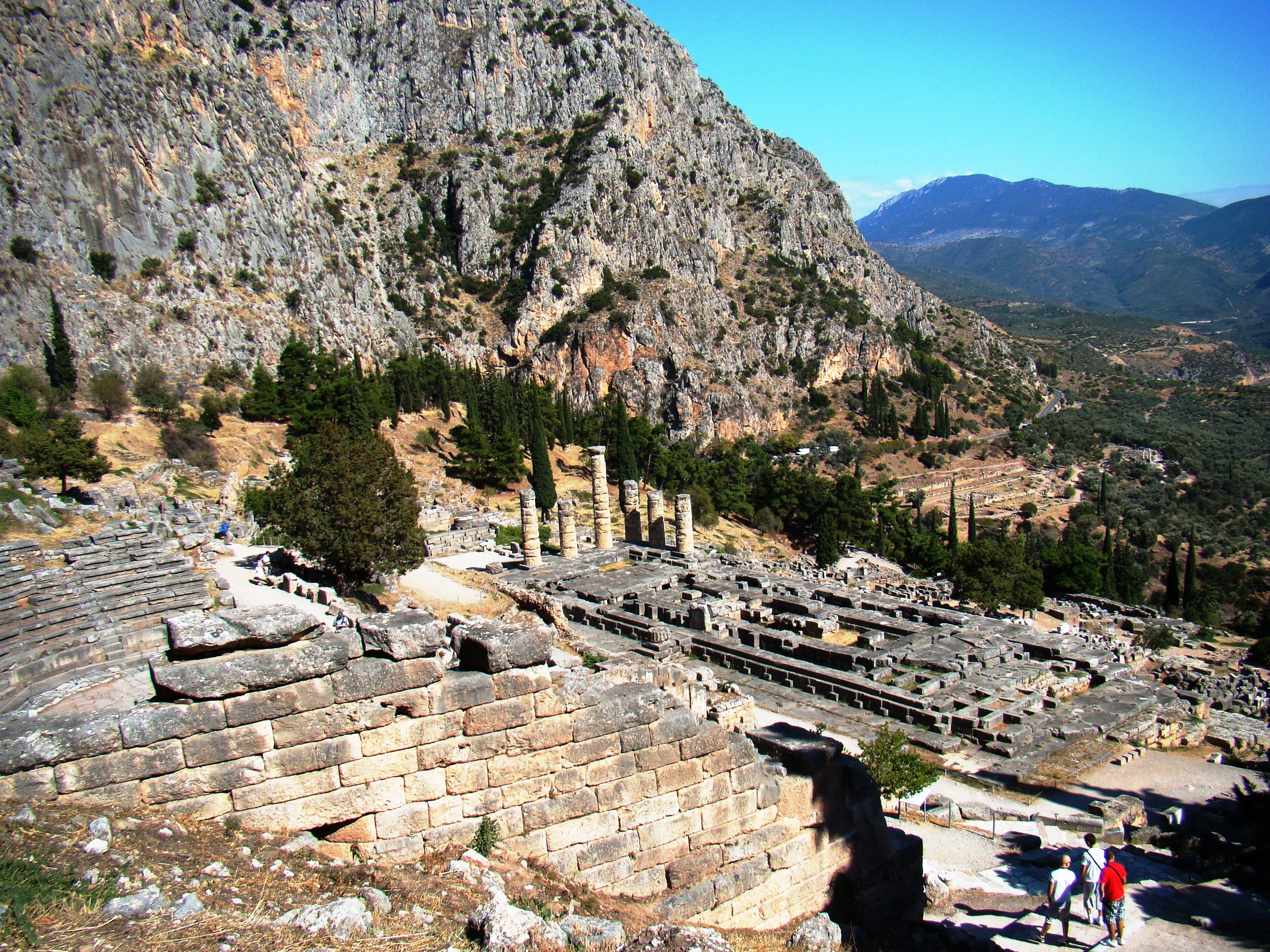
Ruins of the Temple of Apollo at Delphi

According to ancient Greek and Roman authors, there were three maxims prominently inscribed upon the Temple of Apollo at Delphi: "know thyself", "nothing too much" and "give a pledge and trouble is at hand". (Note: The word here translated "pledge" is subject to various possible interpretations; for discussion, see Delphic maxims#Third maxim.) Their exact location is uncertain; they are variously stated to have been on the wall of the pronaos (forecourt), on a column, on a doorpost, on the temple front, or on the propylaea (gateway). The date of their inscription is also unknown, but they were present at least as early as the 5th century BC. Although the temple was destroyed and rebuilt several times over the years, the maxims appear to have persisted into the Roman era (1st century AD), at which time, according to Pliny the Elder, they were written in letters of gold.

The three sayings were traditionally said to have originated with the Seven Sages, a legendary group of philosophers and statesmen who flourished in the 6th century BC. The first known reference to the Seven Sages is in Plato's Protagoras, where they are said to have collectively authored the first two maxims. The names of the sages are given by Plato as Thales, Pittacus, Bias, Solon, Cleobulus, Myson and Chilon; but in the works of later writers, some of these names are dropped and others added in their place. Each of the maxims was often attributed to a particular sage, and some authors, such as Demetrius of Phalerum, assigned additional sayings to the four remaining sages. There was no general agreement over which maxim belonged to which sage, but "know thyself" was most commonly attributed to Chilon.

Another popular theory held that the maxims were first spoken by the Delphic oracle, and therefore represented the wisdom of the god Apollo. Clearchus of Soli, among others, attempted to reconcile the two accounts by claiming that Chilon, enquiring of the oracle what was best to be learnt, received the answer "know thyself", and subsequently adopted the maxim as his own. In all likelihood, however, the sayings were simply common proverbs of much earlier date, which gained a new significance from their prominent position on the temple.

== History of interpretation ==
=== Greco-Roman antiquity ===
==== Earliest references ====
Certain sayings of the philosopher Heraclitus (fl. 500 BC), whose work survives only in fragments, may have been inspired by the Delphic maxims; if so, they represent the earliest known literary references. One of these fragments reads: "It belongs to all men to know themselves and think well [sōphronein]" (DK B116). (Note: The authenticity of fragments B116 and B112 is sometimes disputed; for discussion, see Kahn 1979, pp. 119–120, and Moore 2018, pp. 1–4.) According to classicist Charles H. Kahn, this fragment echoes a traditional belief that "know thyself" had an essentially similar meaning to the second Delphic maxim, "nothing too much"; both sayings might be considered alternative ways of describing the virtue of sophrosyne (lit. "soundness of mind"). In another fragment (B112), Heraclitus defines sophrosyne as the art of "perceiving things according to their nature", apparently referring to the perception of objective, material facts. If so, and if self-knowledge is the same as sophrosyne, then, as Kahn writes, "the deepest structure of the self will be recognized as co-extensive with the universe in general … so true self-knowledge will coincide with knowledge of the cosmic order".

Another fragment of Heraclitus which seems to allude to the maxim is B101: "I went in search of myself". The implication here, that to know oneself is difficult, appears to contradict the claim in B116 that self-knowledge is something that all men can or should accomplish. Kahn understands the lesson of the two fragments taken together to be that, while all men have the ability or capacity to know themselves, only a very few will arrive at that knowledge. Expanding on this, Christopher Moore argues that Heraclitus viewed self-knowledge as a continuous process rather than a destination, since the recognition of oneself as an epistemic agent (i.e. as something capable of knowing) brings with it the desire to improve one's ability to know. Ultimately, however, the meaning of these fragments cannot be established with any certainty.

A fragment from Ion of Chios (c. 480 – c. 421 BC) provides the earliest explicit reference to the maxim. It reads: "This 'know yourself' is a saying not so big, but such a task Zeus alone of the gods understands." Again, it is not possible to infer from this what sort of task "knowing oneself" was understood to be, except that it was something extremely difficult to accomplish, but the fragment bears testimony to the fact that the phrase was a well-known saying during Ion's lifetime.

==== "Know your limits" ====
A clearer application of the maxim occurs in Prometheus Bound, a play attributed to Aeschylus and written sometime before 424 BC. In this play, the Titan Prometheus is chained to a rock as punishment for defying the gods. He is visited by Oceanus, who advises him: "Know yourself and adopt new habits, for there is even a new leader among the gods." In this context, "know yourself" may carry the meaning of "know your limitations" or "know your place"; indicating that Prometheus must accept that the new leader of the gods, Zeus, is more powerful than himself.

Some scholars dispute this interpretation, but the use of "know yourself" to mean "know your limits" is demonstrated in other ancient texts. Xenophon's Hellenica, for example, describes the overthrow of the Thirty Tyrants by the citizens of Athens in 403 BC, after which Thrasybulus addresses the defeated tyrants as follows: "I advise you ... men of the city, to know yourselves. And you would best learn to know yourselves were you to consider what grounds you have for arrogance, that you should undertake to rule over us." He then asks whether they think they are more just, or more courageous, or more intelligent than other men, indicating that to know oneself is to know one's worth in comparison to others.

In another work of Xenophon, the Cyropaedia, the Lydian king Croesus is captured in battle by Cyrus, and laments his failure to follow the advice of the oracle at Delphi, who had told him that he must know himself in order to be happy. In attempting to wage war against Cyrus, he had overestimated his own ability, and his defeat is therefore a just reward for his ignorance of himself.

Among Latin examples of this usage, the poet Juvenal (1st-2nd century AD) wrote in his 11th Satire that men should not attempt to live beyond their means, and should be aware of their position in the social hierarchy:

From Heaven descended "know thyself", and it ought to be fixed in the heart ... One should know his own measure, and look to it in matters of great or of little importance—even when you buy a fish, that you may not desire a mullet when you've only a gudgeon in your pocket.

Many other instances may be attested of the use of the maxim to mean "know your limits", and this appears to have been its principal meaning up until the 6th century AD. A related usage, possibly inspired by Stoic philosophy, takes the phrase as a memento mori, i.e. "know that you are mortal"; it is quoted with this application by authors including Menander, Seneca, Plutarch and Lucian.

==== Platonic references ====
The Greek philosopher Plato (fl. early 4th century BC) discusses the Delphic maxims, and particularly "know thyself", (Note: "Know thyself" is referenced in Charmides (164d–165a), Protagoras (343b), Phaedrus (229e), Philebus (48c), Laws (11.923a), and Alcibiades I (124b, 129a, 132c).) in several of his Socratic dialogues (fictionalized conversations between Socrates and various interlocutors), and his writings on the subject had a major influence on later interpretations.

In Charmides 164d–165a, Critias argues that self-knowledge is the same as sophrosyne (as discussed above, this word literally means "soundness of mind", but is usually translated "temperance" or "self-control"). He claims that the purpose of the inscription at Delphi is to serve as Apollo's salutation to those who enter the temple – instead of "Hail!", he says "Be temperate!". Critias suggests that the other maxims were added later by those who mistook the first inscription for a piece of general advice rather than a greeting.

In the dialogue, Socrates casts doubt on the identification of self-knowledge with sophrosyne, but ultimately leaves the question unresolved. (Note: The identification of the two virtues is taken for granted by the Socrates of Alcibiades 1 (131b, 133c).) However, the work inspired later writers such as Porphyry, Philostratus and Olympiodorus to connect the maxim not only with temperance but also with the other cardinal virtues of courage, justice and wisdom.

In Phaedrus 229e–230a, Socrates is asked whether he believes in the literal truth of the Greek myths; he replies that the myths may have rational explanations behind them, but he himself has no time to investigate these questions:

I have no leisure for them at all; and the reason, my friend, is this: I am not yet able, as the Delphic inscription has it, to know myself; so it seems to me ridiculous, when I do not yet know that, to investigate irrelevant things. And so I dismiss these matters and accepting the customary belief about them, as I was saying just now, I investigate not these things, but myself, to know whether I am a monster more complicated and more furious than Typhon or a gentler and simpler creature, to whom a divine and quiet lot is given by nature.

This passage provides the first recorded use of the maxim in the sense of "knowing one's soul". Modern scholarship is divided as to whether Socrates is talking here about knowing one's own individual soul, or knowing more generally what it is to be human. His framing of the question in comparative terms (in saying that his nature may be either more or less complex than that of the mythological giant Typhon) seems to suggest that even if he only seeks to know himself as an individual, his character, as Charles L. Griswold writes, "will have to be understood relative to some larger context of which he is one part".

In Alcibiades I (a work of disputed authenticity, but which has traditionally been ascribed to Plato), Socrates persuades the youth Alcibiades not to enter into politics until he is further advanced in wisdom. Self-knowledge is one of the main themes of the dialogue, and Socrates quotes the Delphic maxim several times throughout.

On the first occasion (124b), Socrates uses the maxim in its traditional sense of "know your limits", advising Alcibiades to measure his strengths against those of his opponents before pitting himself against them. Later, after convincing Alcibiades of the necessity of cultivating or taking care of himself, Socrates again makes reference to the maxim when he argues that one cannot cultivate oneself without first knowing what is meant by the word "self" – and to know this, as the Delphic inscription implies, is something "difficult, and not for everybody" (127d–129a). In the ensuing dialogue, the two men agree that the self is not the body, and neither is it some combination of soul and body; they therefore conclude that a man's self is "nothing other than his soul" (130a–c).

Socrates then considers how one should obtain knowledge of the soul (132c–133c). He begins by asking how they would solve the puzzle if, instead of "know thyself", the inscription at Delphi had read "see thyself". He observes that the surface of an eye is reflective, and that an eye is therefore able to see itself by looking into another eye – specifically, into the pupil, that part of an eye "in which the good activity of an eye actually occurs". By analogy, for a soul to know itself, "it must look at a soul, and especially at that region in which what makes a soul good, wisdom, occurs". This region "resembles the divine, and someone who looked at that and grasped everything divine ... would have the best grasp of himself as well". Commentators who focus on this latter point interpret Socrates' argument to mean that self-knowledge is accomplished through knowledge of God; (Note: In some versions of the passage, Socrates goes on to say explicitly that God is "the finest mirror available", and that to look at God is to know oneself, but these lines are probably an interpolation. Julia Annas argues that even if these lines are spurious, "they merely underline what is there already: knowing one's real self is knowing God, where God is of course not a person, but is just what is ultimately real".) while others, concentrating on the image of eye looking into eye, infer that self-knowledge is accomplished only through knowledge of other human souls.

==== "Know your faults" ====
After Plato, knowledge of the self was often equated with knowledge of the soul, and specifically with knowledge of one's own character, so that in time, the maxim acquired the subsidiary meaning of "know your faults". The physician Galen (129 – c. 216 AD) employs it in this sense in his work On the Diagnosis and Cure of the Soul's Passions, where he observes that those who are the most prone to error are the least aware of their own failings. He attributes this to the fact that they do not take any note of the opinions of others, believing their own self-assessments to be accurate, whereas "those men who leave to others the task of declaring what kind of men they are fall into few errors".

In the Magna Moralia (traditionally attributed to Aristotle), it is pointed out that people frequently criticize others for faults of which they themselves are guilty, and this is presented as evidence for the claim that to know oneself is difficult. The author's proposed solution is reminiscent of Plato's analogy of the eye seeing itself:

Just as when we want to see our own face we do so by looking into the mirror, in the same way when we want to know ourselves we can obtain that knowledge by looking at a friend. For a friend is, as we assert, another I.

==== Stoicism ====
Stoicism – a school of philosophy founded by Zeno of Citium in the early 3rd century BC – placed great emphasis on "know thyself", making this the very essence of wisdom. The Roman statesman Cicero (106–43 BC), in a passage from De Legibus which has been described as "clearly Stoic", writes that "wisdom is the mother of all the virtuous arts ... for wisdom alone has taught us, among other things, the most difficult of all lessons, namely, to know ourselves". He goes on to explain that he who knows himself will first discover that he is "inspired by a divine principle", and will then find all "the intelligible principles of things delineated, as it were, on his mind and soul". This will assist him in the attainment of wisdom, which in turn will help him to be virtuous, and consequently happy.

After a brief discourse on the advantages of virtue, Cicero continues:

When this man shall have surveyed the heavens, the earth, and the seas, and studied the nature of all things, and informed himself from whence they have been generated, to what state they will return, and of the time and manner of their dissolution, and has learnt to distinguish what parts of them are mortal and perishable, and what divine and eternal — when he shall have almost attained to a knowledge of that Being who superintends and governs these things, and shall look on himself as not confined within the walls of one city, or as the member of any particular community, but as a citizen of the whole universe, considered as a single Commonwealth: amid such a grand magnificence of things as this, and such a prospect and knowledge of nature, what a knowledge of himself, O ye immortal Gods, will a man arrive at! That is the warning of the Pythian Apollo.

Cicero further argues that the self-knowing man will protect himself from falling into error by studying the art of reasoning, and will learn to persuade others through the study of rhetoric. Thus Cicero links together the three traditional parts of wisdom – ethics, physics and logic – and makes each of them a function of self-knowledge.

While scholars are not unanimous in taking this passage to be representative of Stoic thought, the emperor Julian (331–363 AD), in his sixth Oration, explains the importance of the maxim for the Stoics in similar terms:

That they [the Stoics] made 'know thyself' into the main point of their philosophy, you may believe, if you will, not only from the things which they brought up in their writings, but even more so by the end of their philosophy: for they made the end living in consistency with nature, which cannot be achieved if one does not know who one is, and of what nature one is; for someone who does not know who he is, will surely not know what he ought to do.

==== Christianity ====
The idea of the Stoics that knowledge of the universe is a necessary prequisite to knowledge of the self was taken up by several early Christian authors, for whom knowledge of the universe also entailed knowledge of God.

The Octavius of Marcus Minucius Felix (2nd or 3rd century AD) features a dialogue between the pagan Caecilius and the Christian Octavius. Caecilius claims that "the mediocre abilities of man are quite inadequate for exploring divine matters", and that man therefore should not attempt to uncover the mysteries of nature, but should be content merely to "follow the old maxim of the Sage and get to know ourselves more intimately". Octavius agrees that man should know himself, but argues:

These very problems we cannot explore and delve into without holding an investigation of the whole of the universe as well. The explanation is that all things are so closely linked, bound, and chained together that unless you have taken great care to unravel what is the nature of God, you cannot know what is the nature of man.

This idea was connected by some authors (including Clement of Alexandria and Ambrose) with the doctrine that God made man in his own image – so to know God is to know oneself, and vice versa. One aspect of this thought is that to know oneself is to know one's sinful nature; which knowledge, by drawing the Christian on to repentance, enables him to separate himself from his earthly desires and discover his true self in the immortal soul.

Clement of Alexandria (c. 150 – c. 215 AD) attempts to prove in the Stromata that the Greeks derived their wisdom from the Hebrew scriptures, and in this connection cites numerous Bible passages which he believes may have inspired the Delphic maxims. Against "know thyself" he places the phrase "take heed to thyself", which is found in three places in the Bible (Exodus 10:28, 34:12; Deuteronomy 4:9). Similarly, Origen (c. 185 – c. 253) claims that the Greek sages were pre-empted by the Song of Songs, which contains the line: "If you do not know yourself, O fair one among women" (1:8, LXX). (Note: This rendering, given in the Greek Septuagint, is based on a misreading of the Hebrew. The verse should actually read simply "If you do not know".) Later Christian authors who wrote about self-knowledge tended to do so in the context of one of these two texts, without explicit reference to the Delphic maxim.

=== Middle Ages ===
As a consequence of the above-mentioned writings by Clement and Origen, Christian authors in the Middle Ages rarely alluded directly to the Delphic "know thyself", although the general theme of self-knowledge was discussed at length by authors such as Thomas Aquinas, and is prominent in the literature of Christian mysticism. Among those who quote the maxim directly are Hugh of Saint Victor (Didascalicon 1.1) and Richard of Saint Victor (Benjamin Minor, ch. 75), who both conceive of self-knowledge as a route to the understanding of God.

In Islamic literature, references to "know thyself" begin to appear from the 9th century onwards. An allusion to it may be found in a hadith first recorded by Yahya ibn Mu'adh (d. 871 AD), which reads: "He who knows himself knows his Lord." Another version of this saying – "Know thyself, O man, and thou wilt know thy Lord" – is discussed by Avicenna (980–1037 AD), who attributes it to the ancient Greeks. Although he says that it was written on the temple of Asclepius, rather than the temple of Apollo, it is probable that the Delphic maxim was the ultimate source not only of this saying but also of the 9th century hadith. One way in which Islamic scholars understood the message of the maxim was to associate it, as did the Christian authors, with the idea that mankind was created in the image of Allah.

In the 13th century, Jewish philosopher Isaac Albalag brought the Arabic saying quoted by Avicenna into connection with a verse from the Book of Job (19:26): "From my flesh I behold God". This verse had previously been employed by Joseph ibn Tzaddik (d. 1149 AD) as proof that man is a microcosm of the universe; so that by knowing oneself, one will come to know all corporeal and spiritual things, and ultimately God. This microcosm motif is a recurring theme in medieval Jewish philosophy, and is often tied together with the passage from Job. Alexander Altmann considers the common source of such writings to be a fragmentary text by the Neoplatonic philosopher Porphyry (c. 234 – c. 305 AD). The text, titled "On 'Know Thyself'", reports a claim made by certain authors that the Delphic inscription "is an exhortation to know man", and that "since man is a microcosm it commands him only to philosophize ... [because] by examining and finding ourselves, we pass the more easily to the contemplation of the Whole."

Another concept discussed by Porphyry in this work, followed up by both Jewish and Islamic authors, is that the true self is identical with the intellect, as contrasted with sensation or passion. To know oneself is disengage one's soul from the confusion and impurity of the external world, and to take refuge in pure reason.

=== 16th–17th century ===
From the 16th century, European authors began to return to the Delphic maxim as their starting-point in discussions on the subject of self-knowledge. In religious contexts, the maxim continued to carry the same connotations that it had held for the early Christians, with the understanding that to know oneself was either a route to, or synonymous with, knowledge of God. John Calvin's explanation of the importance of self-knowledge in Institutes of the Christian Religion (1536) is typical of the manner in which the topic was discussed by theologians of the era:

With good reason the ancient proverb strongly recommended knowledge of self to man ... Knowledge of ourselves lies first in considering what we were given at creation and how generously God continues his favor toward us, in order to know how great our natural excellence would be if only it had remained unblemished ... Secondly, to call to mind our miserable condition after Adam's fall; the awareness of which, when all our boasting and self-assurance are laid low, should truly humble us and overwhelm us with shame ... and thence is kindled a new zeal to seek God, in whom each of us may recover those good things which we have utterly and completely lost.

In secular literature, the maxim was commonly understood in the ancient sense of "know your limits", and occasionally "know your faults". Sometimes, however, the maxim was taken not as a warning against pride, but as an injunction to recognize one's own superior qualities. (Note: This usage is also found in some ancient authors, e.g. Cicero, who wrote: "Do not think that 'know thyself' was spoken to diminish arrogance alone, but it means that we should know our good points also.") That this was a popular interpretation is demonstrated by the fact that several prominent authors wrote against it. Calvin, for example, cautions his readers to avoid "perverse" applications of the maxim which would have a man "contemplate in himself nothing but what swells him with empty assurance and puffs him up with pride"; while Thomas Hobbes, in the Leviathan (1651), says that the precept "was not meant, as it is now used, to countenance either the barbarous state of men in power towards their inferiors, or to encourage men of low degree to a saucy behaviour towards their betters".

For Hobbes, the true meaning of the maxim is that when a man is conscious of his own thoughts and passions, and observes how he behaves under their influence, he will have a better understanding of the thoughts and passions that motivate others, and the reasons for their actions. Other writers of the period also emphasized the social dimension of self-knowledge; Thomas Elyot linked the maxim to the Biblical commandment "Love thy neighbour as thyself", and Samuel Pufendorf argued that one should know oneself to be a member of society and obey the laws created for the common good.

Another popular belief during this era was that "know thyself" entailed a knowledge of the human body. Contrary to the conclusion reached in the Platonic Alcibiades, Renaissance authors considered the body to be an integral component of one's selfhood, so anatomical study was believed to be a necessary part of self-knowledge. Furthermore, since human beings represented the pinnacle of God's creation, an understanding of the physical properties which separated humans from animals would help one towards a greater knowledge of "God as architect". The Lutheran reformer Philip Melanchthon, in his 1550 oration on anatomy, (Note: Though written by Melanchthon, the oration was delivered by Jacob Milich.) wrote as follows:

It is a matter altogether worthy of man to behold the nature of things, and not to spurn the contemplation of this wonderful work of the world which ... should remind us of God and of His will. But it is nevertheless most fitting and beneficial to see in ourselves the sequence, shapes, combinations, powers and functions of the parts. They said that there was an oracle, "Know thyself", which admonishes us about many things, but is also adapted so that we examine with zeal the things that are worthy of wonder in ourselves and are the sources of several actions in life. And since men are made for wisdom and justice, and true wisdom is the recognition of God and the contemplation of nature, we should acknowledge that we need to know anatomy in which the causes of many actions and changes can be observed in ourselves.

=== 18th–20th century ===
The maxim was cited only infrequently during the early 18th century; English literature, and especially English poetry, was the most fruitful of references. Alexander Pope explored several traditional interpretations in his Essay on Man (1734), with the poem's most well-known lines containing an exhortation to know the limits of one's wisdom:

Know then thyself, presume not God to scan;
The proper study of mankind is Man.

Other prominent authors who mentioned the maxim in their writings include Laurence Sterne, Samuel Johnson, and the 3rd Earl of Shaftesbury.

Towards the beginning of the 19th century, the maxim began to play a significant role in German philosophy. Immanuel Kant (Metaphysics of Morals, 1797) wrote that "know thyself" should be understood as an ethical commandment to know one's own heart and to understand the motives behind one's actions, in order to harmonize one's will with one's duty. G. W. F. Hegel (Encyclopaedia Part III, 1817) rejects this interpretation, arguing that what is meant is not knowledge of the heart, or knowledge of "the particular capacities, character, propensities and foibles of the single self", but rather knowledge of universal truths. The object of self-knowledge is "mind [or spirit, Geist] as the true and essential being". Further expanding on this in the Introduction to the Lectures on the History of Philosophy (1833), Hegel says that mind, or spirit, only has existence insofar as it knows itself, and that this self-knowledge entails a division of the self into subject and object, causing the spirit to become "objectively existent, putting itself as external to itself". Thus Hegel makes use of the Delphic maxim to explain his theory that the human spirit manifests itself objectively as world history.

German author Goethe also made frequent reference to the maxim. In his poem Zueignung (1787), the female personification of Truth says: "Know thyself, live with the world in peace." This has been called the "keynote" of Goethe's attitude toward the maxim; his central idea, as elaborated in several later writings, was that self-knowledge cannot be obtained through inward contemplation, but only through active engagement with the world, and especially through knowledge of how one is perceived by one's friends.

Richard Wagner wrote an essay "Know Thyself" (Erkenne dich Selbst, 1881), urging the "awakening of humans to their simple, sacred dignity", departing with partisan political battles and identity conflicts, and aiming for a universal recognition of shared human dignity. Friedrich Nietzsche, on the other hand (in "The Use and Abuse of History for Life", 1874), criticizes the historian's fetishization of the past, and argues that the German people should know themselves by discarding old ideas inherited from foreign cultures and looking to their own present needs, so as to develop a new culture which would be a true expression of their national character.

English and American writers of this period rehearsed many of the ancient interpretations of the maxim – often stressing, however, that self-knowledge is ultimately unobtainable. Some argued that man should not seek to know himself at all; Irish poet James Henry contrasted this command of Apollo with the warning of the Christian God to "touch not the tree of knowledge", while Samuel Taylor Coleridge ended a short poem on the subject of the maxim with the lines:

Vain sister of the worm,—life, death, soul, clod–
Ignore thyself, and strive to know thy God!

Translations of the Hindu Upanishads began to circulate in Europe for the first time during the 19th century, and this gave rise to comparisons between "know thyself" and "tat tvam asi" ("that thou art"), one of the Hindu Mahāvākyas or Great Sayings. Richard Wagner, in the above-mentioned essay, was the first to explicitly make this connection, although he claimed that the link was implicitly present in the work of philosopher Arthur Schopenhauer. The tat tvam asi indicates that each individual entity in the universe shares a single essence, which is the true Self (Ātman), with the individual personality being only an illusion. This concept continued to inspire Western authors into the 20th century, and the Delphic precept was increasingly reframed as a proclamation of the oneness of the individual with his neighbour and with God.

The late 19th and early 20th centuries also saw the birth of psychoanalysis, which would come to take "know thyself" as its watchword. The founder of the discipline, Sigmund Freud, quoted the maxim only once, in The Psychopathology of Everyday Life (1901), but in later decades it became a common assertion among practitioners in the field that to know oneself means to understand one's unconscious mind. Certain branches of psychoanalysis, based around object relations theory, focus on the role of interpersonal relationships in the development of the ego, allowing this application of the maxim to incorporate the idea that self-knowledge depends upon knowledge of others.
