= Self-knowledge =

Self-knowledge may refer to:

- Self-knowledge (psychology)
- Philosophy of self
- "Self Knowledge", a poem by Samuel T. Coleridge centering on the Delphic maxim know thyself
