= Hippobotus =

Hippobotus (/hɪˈpɒbətəs/; Ancient Greek: Ἱππόβοτος; fl. c. 200 BC) was a Greek historian of philosophers and philosophical schools. His writings are frequently quoted by Diogenes Laërtius. He wrote On the Sects (Greek: Περὶ Αἱρέσεων) and a Register of Philosophers (Greek: Τῶν Φιλοσόφων Ἀναγραφή). He treated philosophers as early as the Seven Sages and Pythagoras, and as late as Crates, Menedemus, and Zeno, hence it is inferred that he wrote in the 3rd or 2nd century BC. His work included lists of pupils of Zeno and Timon. Diogenes Laërtius relates that Hippobotus refused to put the Cynic, Eleatic and Dialectical schools into his On Sects.
