= Ne quid nimis =

Latin phrase

Ne quid nimis is Latin for "nothing in excess".

It is a behavioral norm that is found in the Andria (comedy) (v. 61) by Terence. It is a translation of the Greek μηδὲν άγαν inscribed on the temple of Apollo in Delphi.

== See also ==
- Delphic maxims
- List of Latin phrases
