= Thales of Miletus =

Ancient Greek philosopher (c. 626 – c. 545 BC)

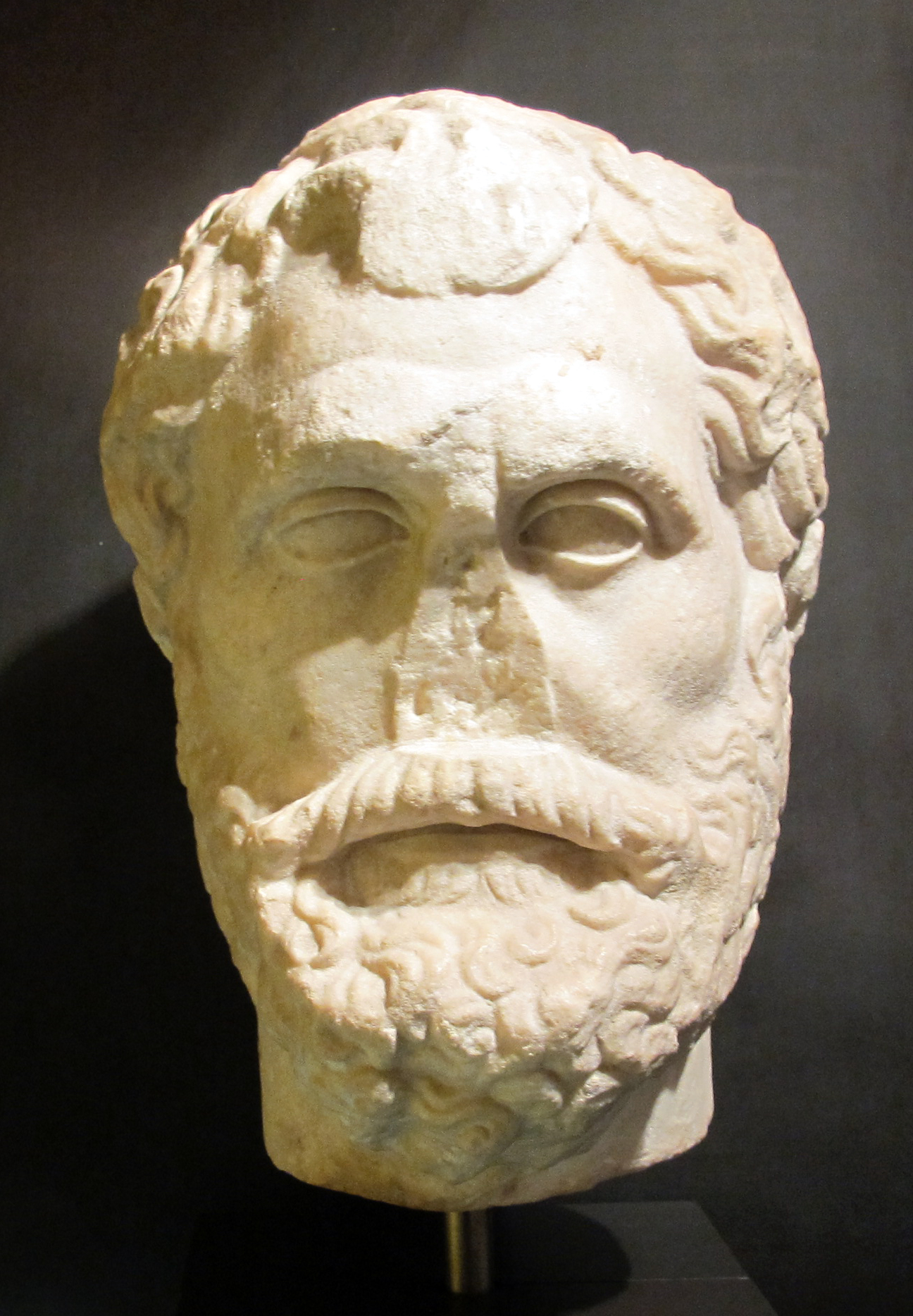
- 2nd century Roman copy of a bust of Thales
- Born: c. 626/623 BC; Miletus, Ionian League
- Died: c. 548/545 BC (aged c. 78)

Philosophical work
- Era: Pre-Socratic philosophy
- Region: Western philosophy
- School: Ionian/Milesian
- Main interests: Metaphysics; mathematics; astronomy
- Notable ideas: Philosophical inquiry; Water is the arche; Eclipse of Thales; Thales's theorem; Intercept theorem; Know thyself; Static electricity

Thales of Miletus (/ˈθeɪliːz/ THAY-leez; Ancient Greek: Θαλῆς; c. 626/623 – c. 548/545 BC) was a pre-Socratic Greek philosopher from Miletus in Ionia, Asia Minor. Thales was one of the Seven Sages, founding figures of Ancient Greece.

Beginning in eighteenth-century historiography, many came to regard him as the first philosopher in the Greek tradition, breaking from the prior use of mythology to explain the world and instead using natural philosophy. He is thus otherwise referred to as the first to have engaged in mathematics, science, and deductive reasoning.

Thales's view that all of nature is based on the existence of a single ultimate substance, which he theorized to be water, was widely influential among the philosophers of his time. Thales thought the Earth floated on water.

In mathematics, Thales is the namesake of Thales's theorem, and the intercept theorem can also be referred to as Thales's theorem. Thales was said to have calculated the heights of the pyramids and the distance of ships from the shore. In science, Thales was an astronomer who reportedly predicted the weather and a solar eclipse. The discovery of the position of the constellation Ursa Major is also attributed to Thales, as well as the timings of the solstices and equinoxes. He was also an engineer, known for having allowed the Lydian army to cross the Halys River. Plutarch wrote that "at that time, Thales alone had raised philosophy from mere speculation to practice."

== Life ==
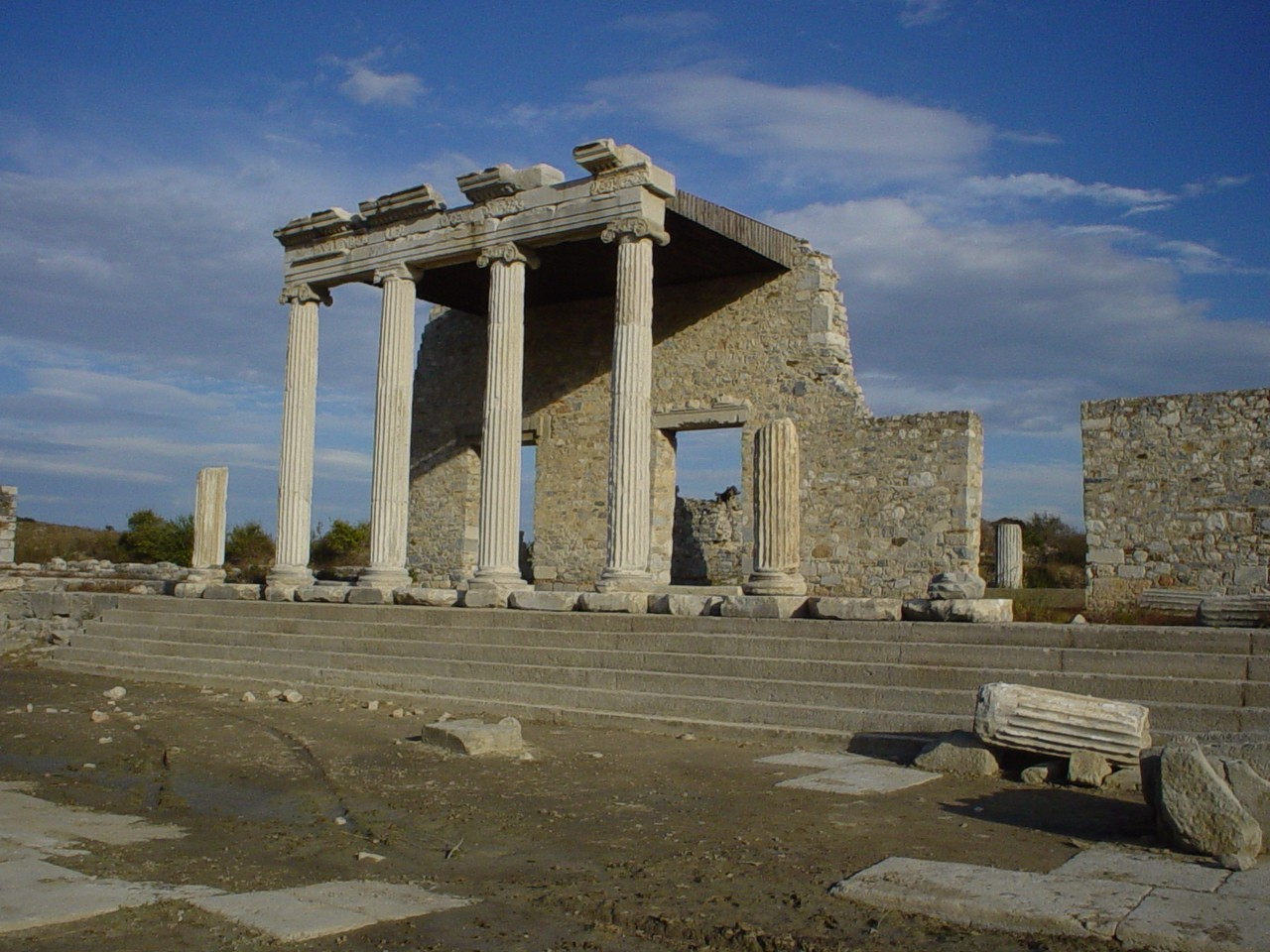
The Ionic Stoa on the Sacred Way in Miletus.

The main source concerning the details of Thales's life and career is the doxographer Diogenes Laërtius, in his third-century-AD work Lives and Opinions of the Eminent Philosophers. While it is all we have, Diogenes wrote some eight centuries after Thales's death, and his sources often contained "unreliable or even fabricated information". (Note: This use of hearsay and a lack of citing original sources leads some historians, like Dicks and Werner Jaeger, to view the whole idea of pre-Socratic philosophy as a construct from a later age, "fashioned during the two or three generations from Plato to the immediate pupils of Aristotle".) It is known Thales was from Miletus, a mercantile city settled at the mouth of the Maeander River, near modern Didim, Turkey.

The dates of Thales's life are not exactly known, but are roughly established by a few datable events mentioned in the sources. According to the historian Herodotus, writing in the 5th century BC, Thales predicted a solar eclipse in 585 BC. Assuming one's acme (or floruit) occurred at the age of 40, the chronicle of Apollodorus of Athens, written during the 2nd century BC, therefore placed Thales's birth about the year 625 BC.

=== Ancestry and family ===
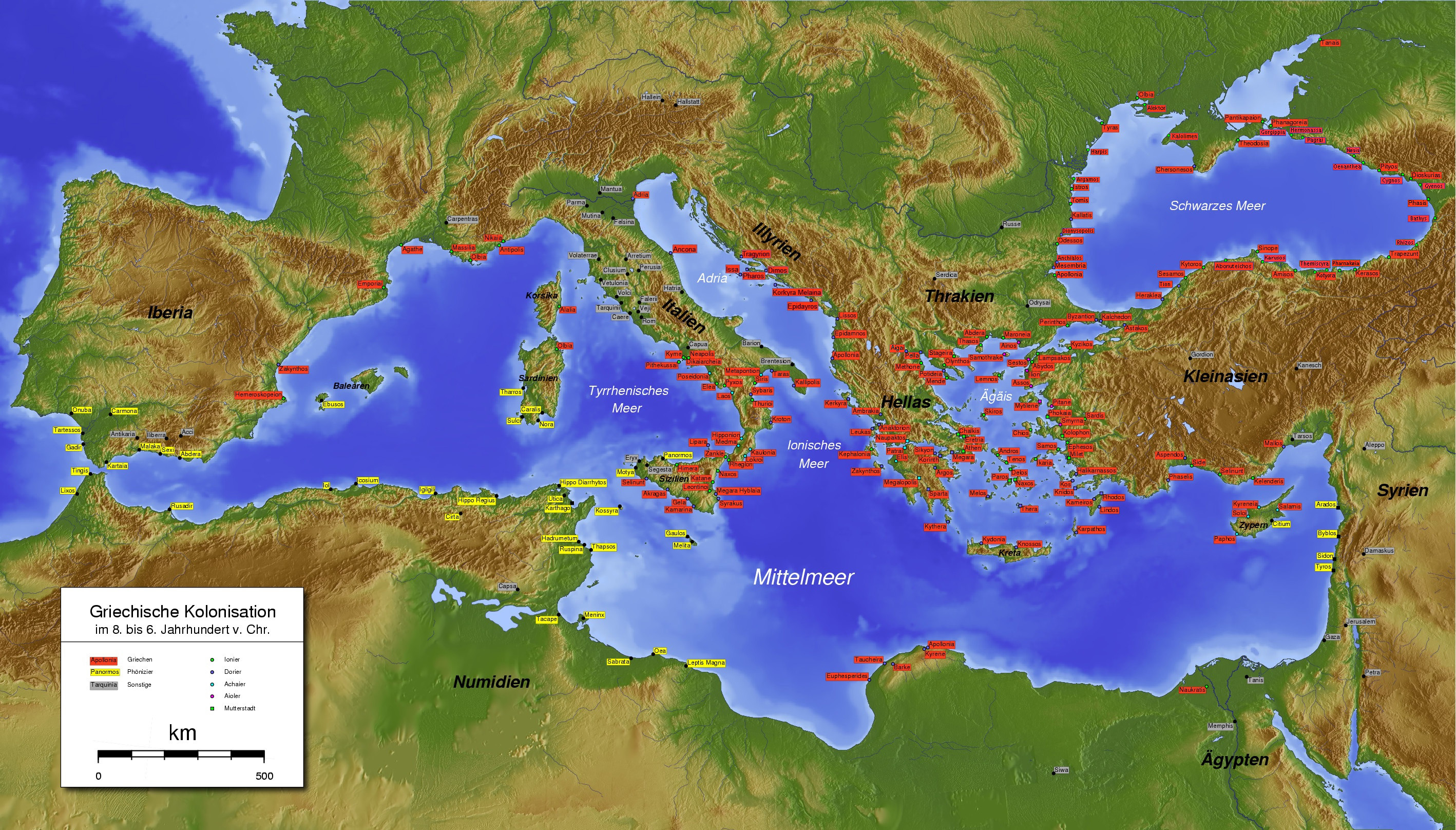
Map of Phoenician (in yellow) and Greek colonies (in red) between the 8th and 6th centuries BC

While the probability is that Thales was as Greek as most Milesians, Herodotus described Thales as "a Phoenician by remote descent". Diogenes Laërtius references Herodotus, Duris, and Democritus, who all agree "that Thales was the son of Examyas and Cleobulina, and belonged to the Thelidae who are Phoenicians and amongst the noblest descendants of Cadmus and Agenor" who had been banished from Phoenicia and that Thales was enrolled as a citizen in Miletus along with Neleus.

However, Friedrich Nietzsche and others interpret this quote as meaning only that his ancestors were seafaring Cadmeians from Boeotia. It is also possible that he was of mixed ancestry, given his father had a Carian name and his mother had a Greek name. Diogenes Laërtius seems to also reference an alternative account: "Most writers, however, represent him as a genuine Milesian and of a distinguished family". Encyclopedia Britannica (1952) concluded that Thales was most likely a native Milesian of noble birth and that he was certainly a Greek.

Diogenes continues by delivering more conflicting reports: one that Thales married and either fathered a son (Cybisthus or Cybisthon) or adopted his nephew of the same name; the second that he never married, telling his mother as a young man that it was too early to marry, and as an older man that it was too late. (Note: In addition, his supposed mother, Cleobulina, has also been described as his companion instead of his mother.) Plutarch had earlier told this version: Solon visited Thales and asked him why he remained single; Thales answered that he did not like the idea of having to worry about children. Nevertheless, several years later, anxious for family, he adopted his nephew Cybisthus.

=== Travels ===
The culture of Archaic Greece was heavily influenced by those of the Levant and Mesopotamia. It is said Thales was engaged in trade and visited either Egypt or Babylonia. However, there is no strong evidence that Thales ever visited countries in the Near East, and the issue is disputed among scholars. Visits to such places were a commonplace attribution to various philosophers by later writers, especially when these writers tried to explain the origin of their mathematical knowledge, such as with Thales or Pythagoras or Eudoxus.

==== Egypt ====
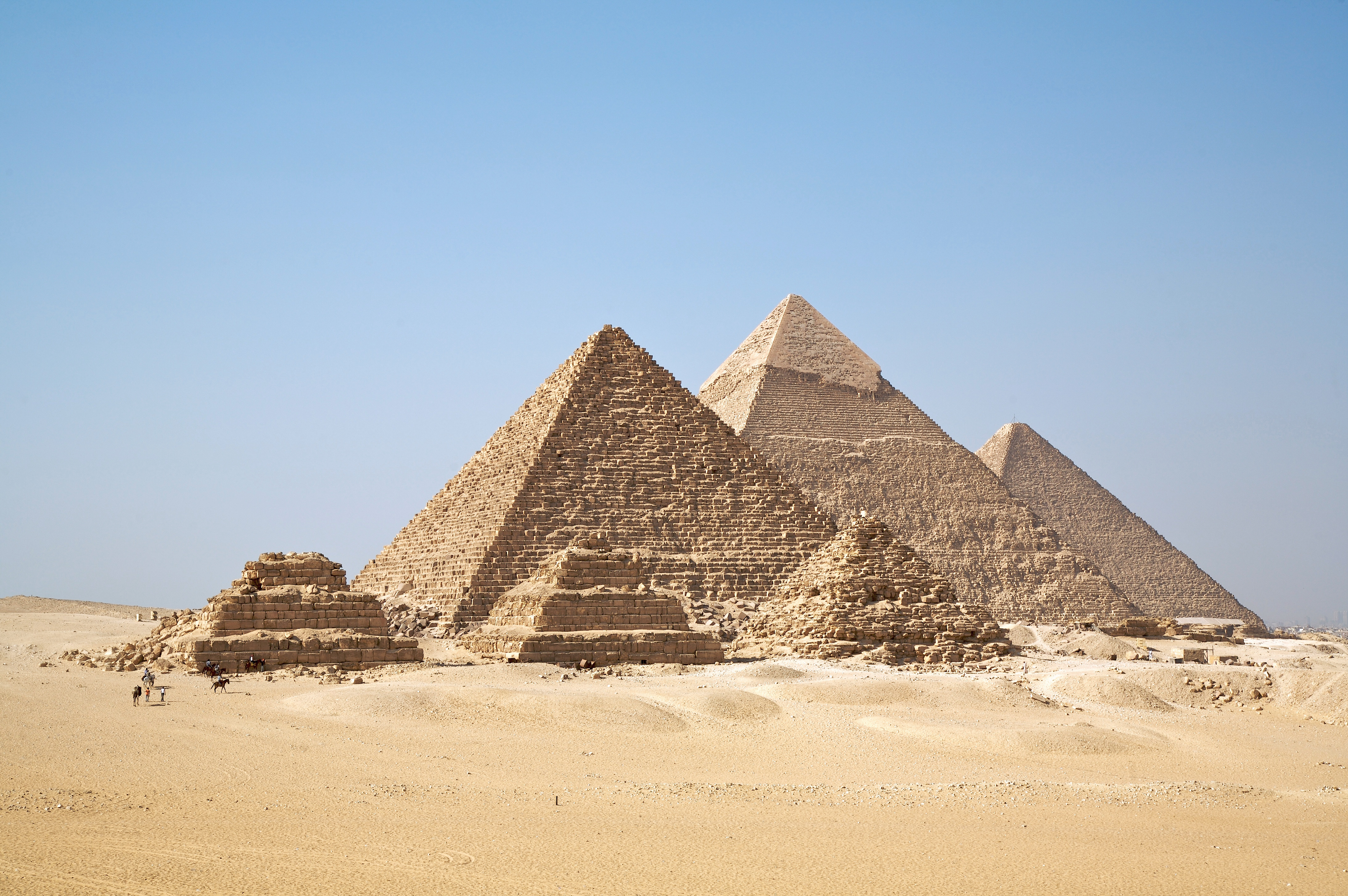
Thales may have been educated in Egypt.

Several ancient authors assume that Thales, at one point in his life, visited Egypt, where he learned about geometry. It is considered possible that Thales visited Egypt, since Miletus had a permanent colony there (namely Naucratis). It is also said that Thales had close contacts with the priests of Thebes who instructed him, or even that he instructed them in geometry. It is also possible Thales knew about Egypt from accounts of others, without actually visiting it.

==== Babylon ====
Aside from Egypt, the other mathematically advanced ancient civilization before the Greeks was Babylonia, another common destination for a mathematically minded philosopher.

Historians Roger L. Cooke and B.L. Van der Waerden come down on the side of Babylonian mathematics influencing the Greeks, citing the use of e. g. the sexagesimal system (or base 60). Cooke notes "This relation, however, is controversial." Other historians, such as D. R. Dicks, take issue with the idea of Babylonian influence on Greek mathematics. For until around the time of Hipparchus (c. 190–120 BC) their sexagesimal system was unknown.

Herodotus wrote that the Greeks learned the gnomon from the Babylonians. Thales's follower, Anaximander, is credited with introducing the gnomon to the Greeks. Herodotus also wrote that the practice of dividing the day into 12 parts, and the polos, came to the Greeks from the Babylonians. (Note: The exact meaning of this use of the word polos is unknown; current theories include: "the heavenly dome", "the tip of the axis of the celestial sphere", or a spherical concave sundial.) Yet this too is disputed, for example by historian L. Zhmud, who points out the gnomon was known to both Egyptians and Babylonians, the division of the day into twelve parts (and by analogy the year) was known to the Egyptians already in the 2nd millennium BC, and the idea of the polos was not used outside of Greece at this time.

=== Sagacity ===
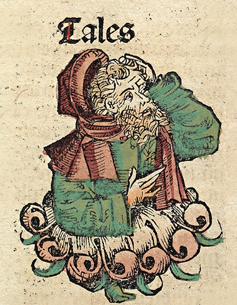
Thales, Nuremberg Chronicle.

Thales is recognized as one of the Seven Sages of Greece, semi-legendary wise statesmen and founding figures of Ancient Greece. While which seven one chooses may change, the seven have a canonical four, which include Thales, Solon of Athens, Pittacus of Mytilene, and Bias of Priene. Diogenes Laërtius tells us that the Seven Sages were created in the archonship of Damasius at Athens about 582 BC and that Thales was the first sage. (Note: The same story, however, asserts that Thales emigrated to Miletus; and that he did not become a student of nature until after his political career. This story has to be rejected if one is to believe that Thales was a native of Miletus, and other typical things about him like his prediction of the eclipse.)

The sages were associated with the Delphic maxims, a quote or maxim attributed to each one, inscribed on the Temple of Apollo at Delphi. Thales has arguably the most famous of all, gnothi seauton or know thyself. According to the 10th-century Byzantine encyclopedia, the Suda, the proverb is both "applied to those whose boasts exceed what they are" and "a warning to pay no attention to the opinion of the multitude." (Note: The aphorism has also been attributed to various other philosophers. Diogenes Laërtius attributes it to Thales but notes that Antisthenes in his Successions of Philosophers attributes it instead to Phemonoe, a mythical Greek poet. The Roman poet Juvenal quotes the phrase in Greek and states that the precept descended e caelo (from heaven). Other names of potential include Pythagoras and Heraclitus.)

==== Golden tripod ====
Diogenes Laërtius relates several stories of an expensive, gold tripod or bowl that is to go to the most wise. In one version (that Laërtius credits to Callimachus in his Iambics) Bathycles of Arcadia states in his will that an expensive bowl "'should be given to him who had done most good by his wisdom.' So it was given to Thales, went the round of all the sages, and came back to Thales again. And he sent it to Apollo at Didyma, with this dedication...'Thales the Milesian, son of Examyas [dedicates this] to Delphinian Apollo after twice winning the prize from all the Greeks.'"

==== Diplomacy ====
According to Diogenes Laërtius, Thales gained fame as a counselor when he advised the Milesians not to engage in a symmachia, a "fighting together", with the Lydians. This has sometimes been interpreted as an alliance.

Croesus was defeated before the city of Sardis by Cyrus the Great, who subsequently spared Miletus because it had taken no action. Cyrus was so impressed by Croesus’ wisdom and his connection with the sages that he spared him and took his advice on various matters. The Ionian cities should be demoi, or "districts".

He counselled them to establish a single seat of government, and pointed out Teos as the fittest place for it; "for that," he said, "was the centre of Ionia. Their other cities might still continue to enjoy their own laws, just as if they were independent states."

Miletus, however, received favorable terms from Cyrus. The others remained in an Ionian League of twelve cities (excluding Miletus) and were subjugated by the Persians.

== Theories and studies ==
Early Greeks and other civilizations before them often invoked idiosyncratic explanations of natural phenomena, attributing them to the will of anthropomorphic gods and heroes. Instead, Thales aimed to explain natural phenomena via rational hypotheses that referenced natural processes themselves— logos rather than mythos.

Aristotle advocated the view that Thales was the first natural philosopher (physiologoi), although this position was typically not adopted among other writers, even those within Aristotle's Peripatetic school, until the view became more prominent among eighteenth-century historians. Also, while the other Seven Sages were strictly law-givers and statesmen and not speculative philosophers, Plutarch noted: "it would seem that Thales was the only wise man of the time who carried his speculations beyond the realm of the practical."

=== Water as the arche ===
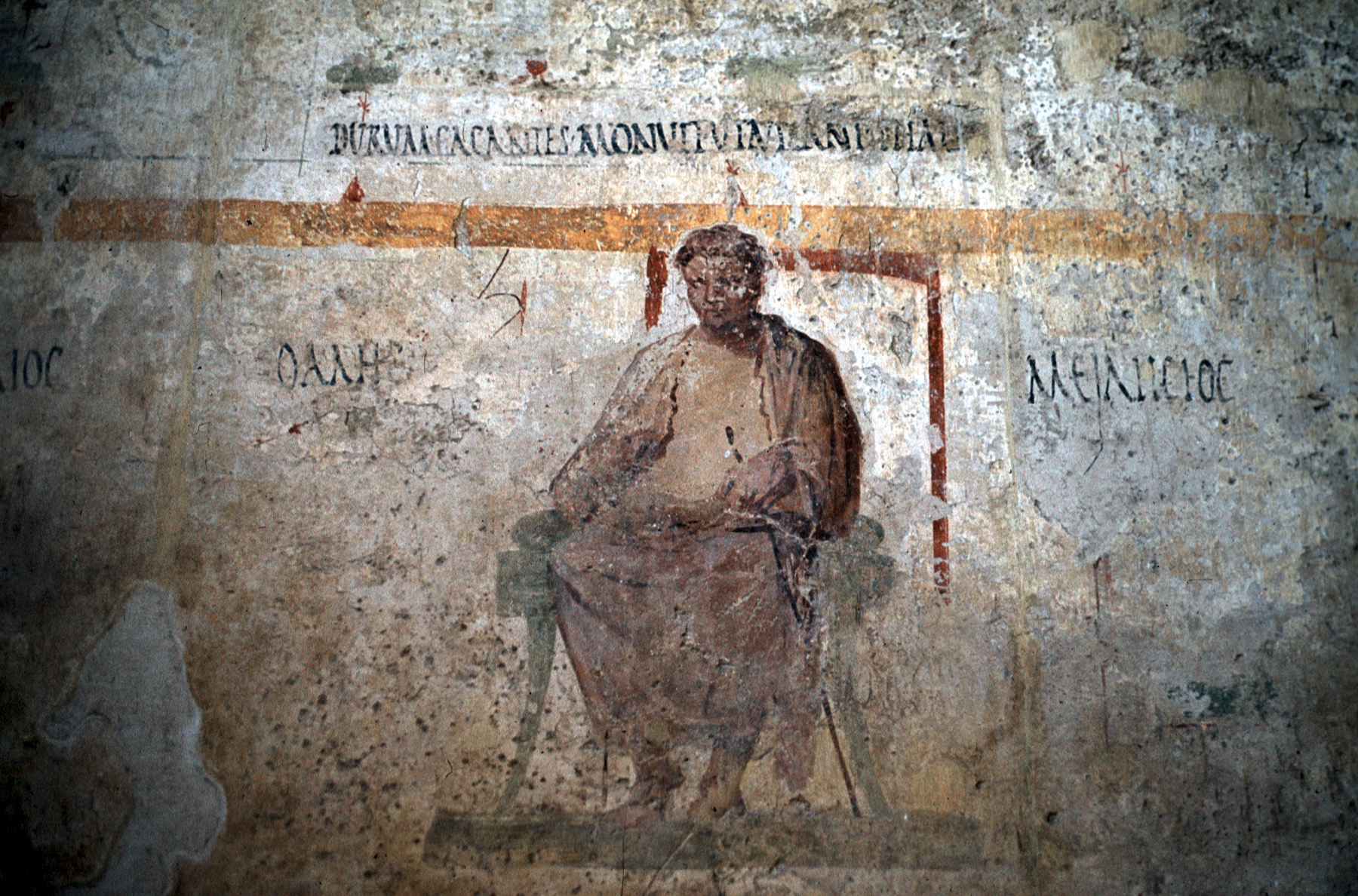
Thales depicted at the Baths of the Seven Sages.

Thales's most famous idea was his philosophical and cosmological thesis that all is water, which comes down to us through a passage from Aristotle's Metaphysics. In the work, Aristotle reported Thales's theory that the arche or originating principle of nature was a single material substance: water. Aristotle then proceeded to proffer a number of conjectures based on his own observations to lend some credence to why Thales may have advanced this idea (though Aristotle did not hold it himself).

While Aristotle's conjecture about why Thales held water as the originating principle of matter is his own, his statement that Thales held it to be water is generally accepted as genuinely originating with Thales. Writing centuries later, Diogenes Laërtius also states that Thales taught "Water constituted (ὑπεστήσατο, 'stood under') the principle of all things." (Note: Historian Abraham Feldman wrote that for Thales "...water united all things...all whatness is wetness".)

According to Aristotle:

That from which is everything that exists and from which it first becomes and into which it is rendered at last, its substance remaining under it, but transforming in qualities, that they say is the element and principle of things that are. …For it is necessary that there be some nature (φύσις), either one or more than one, from which become the other things of the object being saved... [The first philosophers] do not all agree as to the number and the nature of these principles. Thales the founder of this type of philosophy says that it is water.

Aristotle further adds:

Presumably he derived this assumption from seeing that the nutriment of everything is moist, and that heat itself is generated from moisture and depends upon it for its existence (and that from which a thing is generated is always its first principle). He derived his assumption from this; and also from the fact that the seeds of everything have a moist nature, whereas water is the first principle of the nature of moist things." (Note: Feldman notes "The social significance of water in the time of Thales induced him to discern through hardware and dry-goods, through soil and sperm, blood, sweat and tears, one fundamental fluid stuff...water, the most commonplace and powerful material known to him.")

The 1870 book Dictionary of Greek and Roman Biography and Mythology noted:

In his dogma that water is the origin of things, that is, that it is that out of which every thing arises, and into which every thing resolves itself, Thales may have followed Orphic cosmogonies, while, unlike them, he sought to establish the truth of the assertion. Hence, Aristotle, immediately after he has called him the originator of philosophy brings forward the reasons which Thales was believed to have adduced in confirmation of that assertion; for that no written development of it, or indeed any book by Thales, was extant, is proved by the expressions which Aristotle uses when he brings forward the doctrines and proofs of the Milesian. (p. 1016)

Most agree that Thales's stamp on thought is the unity of substance. Not merely the empirical claim that all is water, but the deeper philosophical claim that all is one. For example, Friedrich Nietzsche, in his Philosophy in the Tragic Age of the Greeks, wrote:

Greek philosophy seems to begin with an absurd notion, with the proposition that water is the primal origin and the womb of all things. Is it really necessary for us to take serious notice of this proposition? It is, and for three reasons. First, because it tells us something about the primal origin of all things; second, because it does so in language devoid of image or fable, and finally, because contained in it, if only embryonically, is the thought, "all things are one."

=== Mathematics ===
Megiston topos: apanta gar chorei
(Μέγιστον τόπος· ἄπαντα γὰρ χωρεῖ.)

The greatest is space, for it holds all things.

— attributed to Thales

Thales was known for introducing the theoretical and practical use of geometry to Greece, and has been described as the first person in the Western world to apply deductive reasoning to geometry, making him the West's "first mathematician". He is also credited with the West's oldest definition of number: a "collection of units", "following the Egyptian view".

The evidence for the primacy of Thales comes to us from a book by Proclus, who lived a thousand years afterward but is believed to have had a copy of Eudemus's lost book History of Geometry (4th century BC). (Note: While some historians, such as Colin R. Fletcher, note there could have been a precursor to Thales named by Eudemus, without the work, "the question becomes mere speculation." Fletcher grants that there is no other viable contender to the title of first Greek mathematician, and that Thales qualifies as a practitioner in the field. "Thales had at his command the techniques of observation, experimentation, superposition and deduction... he has proved himself mathematician.") Proclus wrote that Thales was the first to visit Egypt and bring the Egyptian study of mathematics to Greece, and that Thales "himself discovered many propositions and disclosed the underlying principles of many others to his successors, in some case his method being more general, in others more empirical." In addition to Proclus, Hieronymus of Rhodes (3rd century BC) also cites Thales as the first Greek mathematician.

Proclus attributes to Thales the discovery that a circle is bisected by its diameter, that the base angles of an isosceles triangle are equal and that vertical angles are equal. Two fundamental theorems of elementary geometry are customarily called Thales's theorem: one of them has to do with a triangle inscribed in a circle and having the circle's diameter as one side; the other, also called the intercept theorem, is about an angle intercepted by two parallel lines, forming a pair of similar triangles.

Modern scholars are skeptical that anyone in Thales's time was producing mathematical proofs to the standard of later Greek mathematics, though not enough direct evidence remains to draw firm conclusions. While Thales may have discovered some basic geometric relations and provided some justification for them, attribution to him of formal proofs is now thought to represent speculative rationalization and reconstruction by later authors, rather than concrete accomplishments of Thales himself or his contemporaries.

==== Vertical angles ====
According to one author, while visiting Egypt, Thales observed that Egyptians, when drawing two intersecting lines, measured the vertical angles to ensure they were equal. Thales concluded that one could prove that all vertical angles are equal if one accepted some general notions such as: all straight angles are equal, equals added to equals are equal, and equals subtracted from equals are equal.

==== Right triangle inscribed in a circle ====
Thales's theorem: if A̅C̅ is a diameter and B is a point on the diameter's circle, the angle ∠ ABC is a right angle.

Pamphila says that, having learned geometry from the Egyptians, Thales was the first to inscribe in a circle a right-angled triangle, whereupon he sacrificed an ox. This is sometimes cited as history's first mathematical discovery. Due to the variations among testimonies, such as the story of the ox sacrifice being attributed to Pythagoras upon discovery of the Pythagorean theorem rather than Thales, some historians (such as D. R. Dicks) question whether such anecdotes have any historical worth whatsoever.

It is believed that the Babylonians knew the theorem for special cases. The theorem is mentioned and proved as part of the 31st proposition in the third book of Euclid's Elements. Dante's Paradiso refers to Thales's theorem in the course of a speech.

==== Similar triangles ====
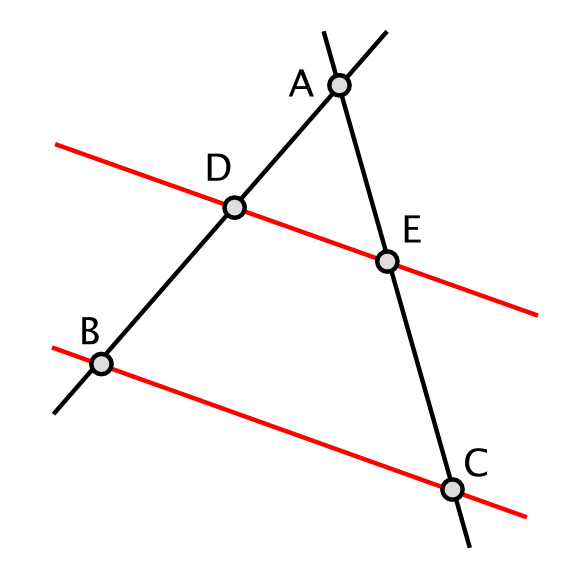
The intercept theorem: DE/BC = AE/AC = AD/AB.

The story is told in Diogenes Laërtius, Pliny the Elder, and Plutarch, sourced from Hieronymus of Rhodes, that when Thales visited Egypt, he measured the height of the pyramids by their shadows at the moment when his own shadow was equal to his height. (Note: A right triangle with two equal legs is a 45-degree right triangle, all of which are similar. The length of the pyramid's shadow measured from the center of the pyramid at that moment must have been equal to its height.) According to Plutarch, it pleased the pharaoh Amasis. More practically, Thales was said to be able to measure the distances to ships at sea.

These stories indicate familiarity with the intercept theorem, and for this reason, the 26th proposition in the first book of Euclid's Elements was attributed to Thales. They also indicate that he was familiar with the Egyptian seked, or seqed, the ratio of the run to the rise of a slope (cotangent). (Note: The seked is at the base of problems 56, 57, 58, 59 and 60 of the Rhind papyrus — an ancient Egyptian mathematical document.) According to Kirk & Raven, all you need for this feat is three straight sticks pinned at one end and knowledge of your altitude. One stick goes vertically into the ground. A second is made level. With the third, you sight the ship and calculate the seked from the height of the stick and its distance from the point of insertion to the line of sight.

=== Astronomy ===
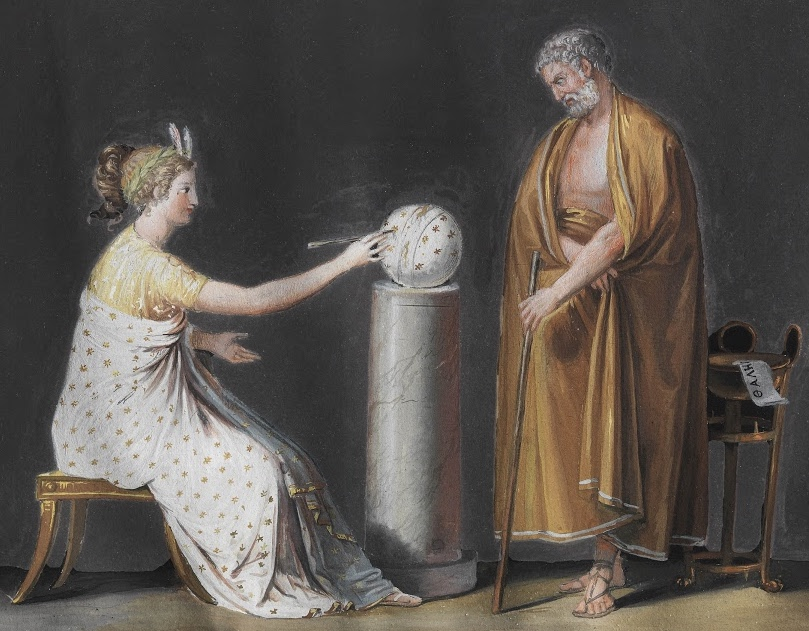
Urania, the Muse of Astronomy, Reveals to Thales the Secrets of the Skies

Thales was also a noted astronomer, acknowledged in antiquity for describing the position of Ursa Minor, and he thought the constellation might be useful as a navigational guide at sea. He calculated the duration of the year and the timings of the equinoxes and solstices. He is additionally attributed with calculating the position of the Pleiades.

Plutarch indicates that in his day (c. AD 100), there was an extant work, the Astronomy, composed in verse and attributed to Thales. While some say he left no writings, others say that he wrote On the Solstice and On the Equinox. The Nautical Star-guide has also been attributed to him, but this was disputed even in ancient times. (Note: According to Diogenes Laertius, the Nautical Astronomy attributed to Thales was written by Phocus of Samos.) No writing attributed to him has survived. Lobon of Argus asserted that the writings of Thales amounted to two hundred lines.

==== Cosmological model ====
Worldview of Thales (left) and pupil Anaximander (right).

Thales thought the Earth must be a flat disk or mound of land and dirt that is floating in an expanse of water. Heraclitus Homericus states that Thales drew his conclusion from seeing moist substance turn into air, slime, and earth. It seems likely that Thales viewed the land as arising from the water on which it floated and the oceans that surround it, perhaps inspired by observations of silt deposits.

He thought the stars were balls of earth on fire. He seemed to correctly gather that the moon reflects the Sun's light. A crater on the Moon is named in his honor.

==== Meteorology ====
Rather than assuming that earthquakes were the result of supernatural whims, Thales explained them by theorizing that the Earth floats on water and that earthquakes occur when the Earth is rocked by waves. He is attributed with the first observation of the Hyades, supposed by the ancients to indicate the approach of rain when they rose with the Sun. According to Seneca, Thales explained the flooding of the Nile as due to the river being beaten back by the Etesian wind.

==== Olive presses ====
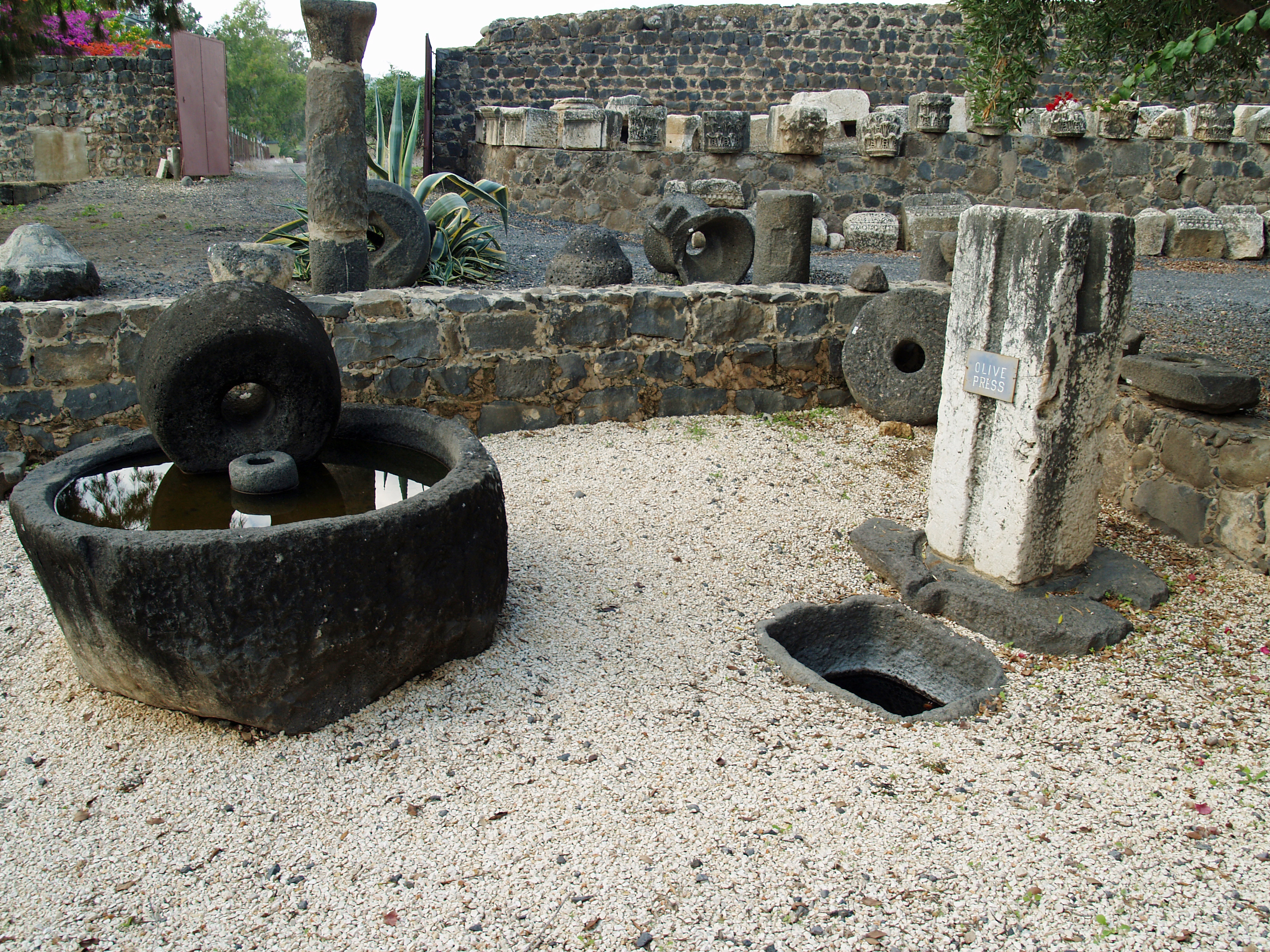
An olive mill and an olive press dating from Roman times in Capernaum, Israel.

A story from Aristotle recounts how Thales achieved riches from an olive harvest by prediction of the weather. One winter, Thales reserved all the olive presses in Miletus after predicting the weather and a good harvest. He was then able to rent them out at a high price when demand peaked in the subsequent bumper crop. This constitutes the first historically known creation and use of futures or options (on usage of olive press), depending on whether Thales's reservations obligated or allowed (respectively) him to rent the presses during harvest time.

Aristotle explains that Thales's objective in doing this was not to enrich himself but to prove to his fellow Milesians that philosophy could be useful, contrary to what they thought, thus disproving the taunts that philosophy was useless. He had answered the proverbial charge "If you're so smart, why ain't you rich?". Aristotle also notes that cornering the market to achieve monopoly pricing is a general strategy for achieving wealth that does not rely on great wisdom or powers of prediction.

==== Prediction of solar eclipse ====
As mentioned above, according to Herodotus, Thales predicted a solar eclipse which occurred during a battle between the Lydians and the Medes. Among eclipses of the era, only the eclipse of 28 May 585 BC reached totality in Anatolia, where the war took place. American writer Isaac Asimov described this battle as the earliest historical event whose date is known with precision to the day, and called the prediction "the birth of science".

Total eclipse of the Sun

Herodotus writes that in the sixth year of the war, the Lydians under King Alyattes and the Medes under Cyaxares were engaged in an indecisive battle when suddenly day turned into night, leading to both parties halting the fighting and negotiating a peace agreement. Herodotus also mentions that the loss of daylight had been predicted by Thales. He does not, however, mention the location of the battle.

Afterwards, on the refusal of Alyattes to give up his suppliants when Cyaxares sent to demand them of him, war broke out between the Lydians and the Medes, and continued for five years, with various success. In the course of it the Medes gained many victories over the Lydians, and the Lydians also gained many victories over the Medes. Among their other battles there was one night engagement. As, however, the balance had not inclined in favour of either nation, another combat took place in the sixth year, in the course of which, just as the battle was growing warm, day was on a sudden changed into night. This event had been foretold by Thales, the Milesian, who forewarned the Ionians of it, fixing for it the very year in which it actually took place. The Medes and Lydians, when they observed the change, ceased fighting, and were alike anxious to have terms of peace agreed on.

However, based on the list of Median kings and the duration of their reign reported elsewhere by Herodotus, Cyaxares died 10 years before the eclipse.

D. R. Dicks joins other historians (F. Martini, J. L. E. Dreyer, O. Neugebauer) in rejecting the historicity of the eclipse story. Dicks links the story of Thales discovering the cause of a solar eclipse with Herodotus' claim that Thales discovered the cycle of the sun in relation to the solstices, and concludes, "he could not possibly have possessed this knowledge which neither the Egyptians nor the Babylonians nor his immediate successors possessed." Thomas Worthen instead proposes that the battle could have been the same "night engagement" mentioned, disrupted by a predicted lunar eclipse.

==== Falling into a well ====
Plato, Diogenes Laertius, and Hippolytus all relay the story that Thales was so intent upon watching the stars that he failed to watch where he was walking, and fell into a well. (Note: The Scottish philosopher Adam Smith once similarly, absent-mindedly fell into a tannery pit.)

"Thales was studying the stars and gazing into the sky, when he fell into a well, and a jolly and witty Thracian servant girl made fun of him, saying that he was crazy to know about what was up in the heavens while he could not see what was in front of him beneath his feet."

=== Engineering ===
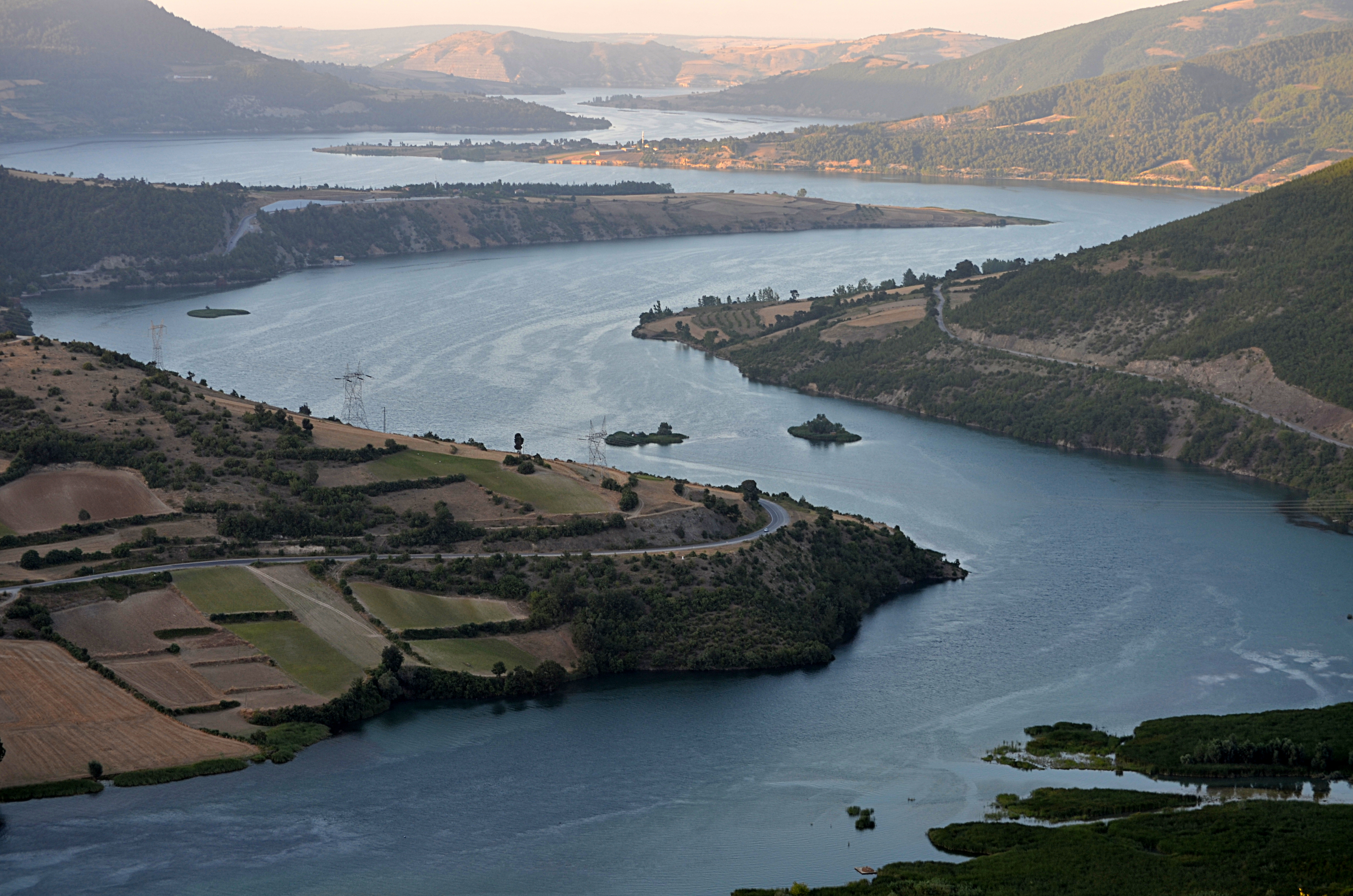
The Halys River

In addition to astronomy, Thales involved himself in other practical applications of mathematics, including engineering. Another story by Herodotus is that Croesus sent his army to the Persian territory. He was stopped by the river Halys, then unbridged. Thales then got the army across the river by digging a diversion upstream to reduce the flow, making it possible to cross. While Herodotus reported that most of his fellow Greeks believed that Thales did divert the river Halys to assist King Croesus' military endeavors, he himself finds it doubtful. Plato praises Thales along with Anacharsis, who is credited as the originator of the potter's wheel and the anchor.

=== Divinity ===
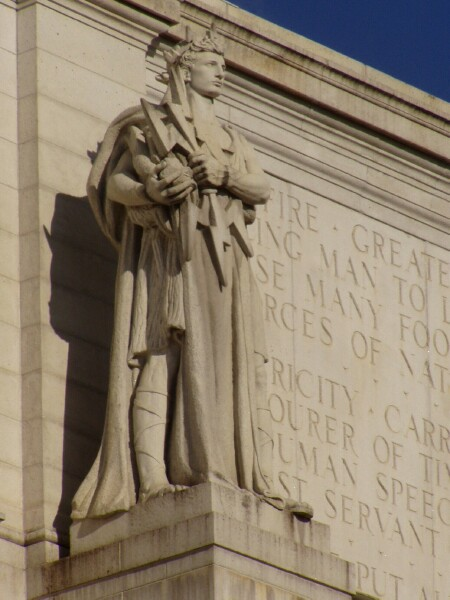
Thales (Electricity), a sculpture from "The Progress of Railroading" (1908), located at the main façade of Washington Union Station

According to Aristotle, Thales thought "all things are full of gods", i.e., lodestones had souls because iron is attracted to them (by the force of magnetism). The same applied to amber for its capacity to generate static electricity. The reasoning for such hylozoism or organicism seems to be that if something moved, then it was alive, and if it was alive, then it must have a soul.

As well as gods seen in the movement caused by what came to be known as magnetism and electricity, it seems Thales also had a supreme God which structured the universe:

"Thales", says Cicero, "assures that water is the principle of all things; and that God is that Mind which shaped and created all things from water."

According to Henry Fielding (1775), Diogenes Laërtius (1.35) affirmed that Thales posed "the independent pre-existence of God from all eternity, stating "that God was the oldest of all beings, for he existed without a previous cause even in the way of generation; that the world was the most beautiful of all things; for it was created by God."

Nicholas Molinari has recently argued that Thales was influenced by the archaic water deity Acheloios, who was equated with water and worshipped in Miletus during Thales's life. For evidence, he points to the fact that hydor meant specifically "fresh water", and also that Acheloios was seen as a shape-shifter in myth and art, so able to become anything. He also points out that the rivers of the world were seen as the "sinews of Acheloios" in antiquity, and this multiplicity of deities is reflected in Thales's idea that "all things are full of gods."

== Death and legacy ==
Diogenes Laërtius quotes Apollodorus as saying that Thales died at the age of 78 during the 58th Olympiad (548–545 BC) and attributes his death to heat stroke and thirst while watching the games.

=== Influence ===
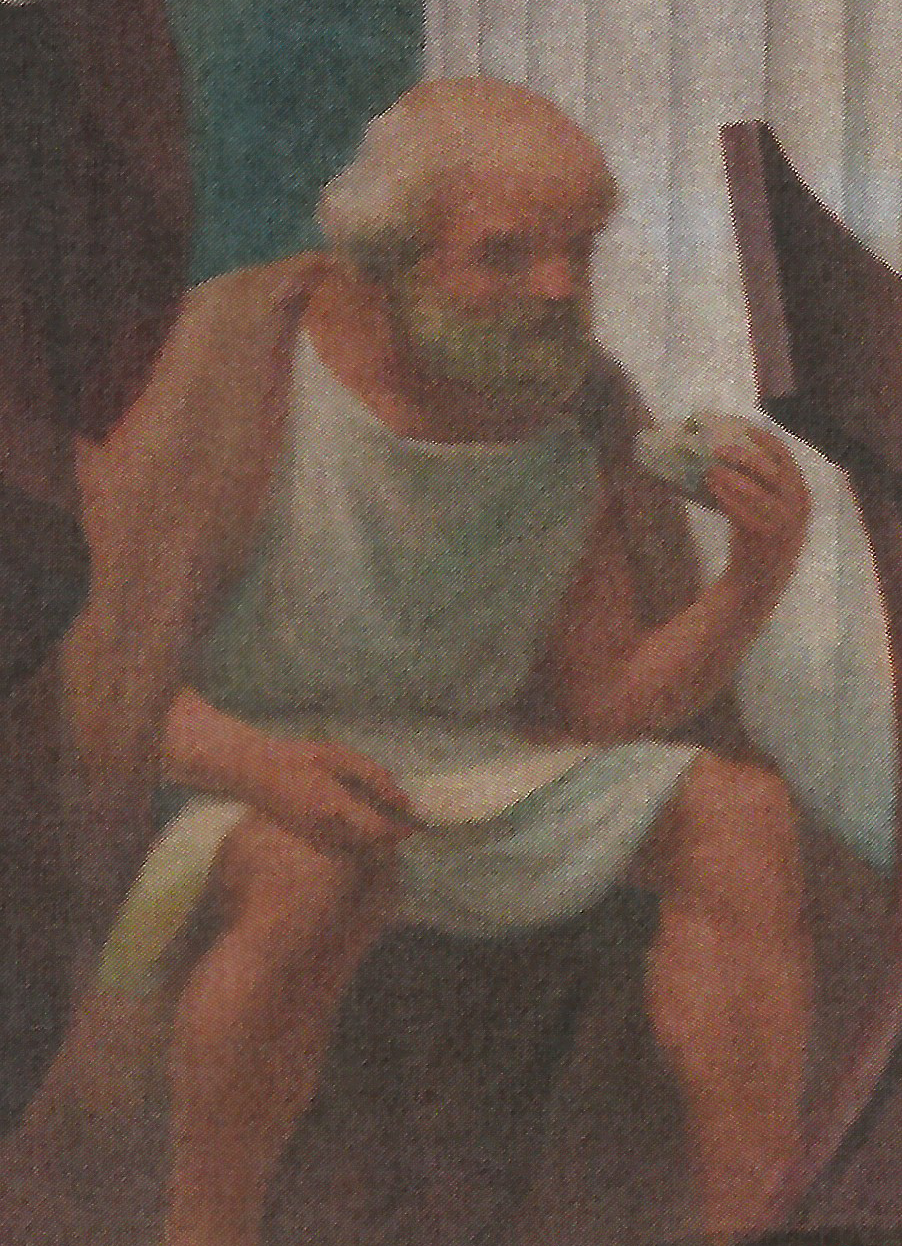
Detail of Thales from The Beginnings of Science (1906) by Veloso Salgado

Thales had a profound influence on other Greek thinkers and therefore on Western history. However, due to the scarcity of sources concerning Thales and the discrepancies between the accounts given in the sources that have survived, there is a scholarly debate over the extent of the influence Thales had and on which of the Greek philosophers and mathematicians that came after him. (Note: Edmund Husserl attempts to capture the new movement as follows. Philosophical man is a "new cultural configuration" based in stepping back from "pregiven tradition" and taking up a rational "inquiry into what is true in itself;" that is, an ideal of truth.)

The first three philosophers in the Western tradition were all cosmologists from Miletus, and Thales was the very first, followed by Anaximander, who was followed in turn by Anaximenes. They have been dubbed the Milesian school. According to the Suda, Thales had been the "teacher and kinsman" of Anaximander. Rather than water, Anaximander held all was made of apeiron or the unlimited; while Anaximenes, the successor of Anaximander, perhaps more like Thales with water, held that everything was composed of air.

John Burnet (1892) noted

Lastly, we have one admitted instance of a philosophic guild, that of the Pythagoreans. And it will be found that the hypothesis, if it is to be called by that name, of a regular organisation of scientific activity will alone explain all the facts. The development of doctrine in the hands of Thales, Anaximander, and Anaximenes, for instance, can only be understood as the elaboration of a single idea in a school with a continuous tradition.

As two of the first Greek mathematicians, Thales is also considered an influence on Pythagoras. According to Iamblichus, Pythagoras "had benefited by the instruction of Thales in many respects, but his greatest lesson had been to learn the value of saving time." Early sources report that Pythagoras, in this story a pupil of Anaximander, visited Thales as a young man, and that Thales advised him to travel to Egypt to further his philosophical and mathematical studies.

Thales was also considered the teacher of the astronomer Mandrolytus of Priene. It is possible he was also the teacher of Cleostratus of Tenedos.

== Works cited ==
- Allman, George Johnston (1911). "Thales of Miletus" . In Chisholm, Hugh (ed.). Encyclopædia Britannica. Vol. 26 (11th ed.). Cambridge University Press. p. 721.
- Boyer, C.B. (1989). A History of Mathematics (2nd ed.). New York: Wiley. ISBN 978-0-471-09763-1. (1991 pbk ed. ISBN 0-471-54397-7; 2011 3rd edition)
- Burnet, John (1920) [1892]. Early Greek Philosophy. A & C Black Ltd. Third Edition
- Cantor, Lea (2022). "Thales – the 'first philosopher'? A troubled chapter in the historiography of philosophy". British Journal for the History of Philosophy. 30 (5): 727–750. doi:10.1080/09608788.2022.2029347.
- Herodotus, Histories, A. D. Godley (translator), Cambridge: Harvard University Press, 1920; ISBN 0-674-99133-8. Online version at Perseus
- Störig, Hans Joachim, Kleine Weltgeschichte der Philosophie. Fischer, Frankfurt/M. 2004, ISBN 3-596-50832-0.
- Lloyd, G. E. R. Early Greek Science: Thales to Aristotle.
- Nahm, Milton C. (1962) [1934]. Selections from Early Greek Philosophy. Appleton-Century-Crofts.
- Pliny the Elder, The Natural History (eds. John Bostock, M.D., F.R.S. H.T. Riley, Esq., B.A.) London. Taylor and Francis. (1855). Online version at the Perseus Digital Library.
- Turner, William (1913). "Ionian School of Philosophy" . In Herbermann, Charles (ed.). Catholic Encyclopedia. New York: Robert Appleton Company.
