= Myson of Chenae =

Sage of Ancient Greece

Myson of Chenae (/ˈmaɪsən, ˈmaɪsɒn/; Ancient Greek: Μύσων ὁ Χηνεύς; fl. 6th-century BC), also called "of Chen", was, according to Plato, one of the Seven Sages of Greece. He is not to be confused with the Myson of 5th-century Athens who ran a pottery and inspired, and taught, many of the Mannerists including the Pan Painter.

== Biography ==
According to Sosicrates, who quoted Hermippus, Myson was the son of Strymon, a tyrant of his country. All sources agree that Myson was a plain farmer, though they differ as to his place of birth and residence. He is said to have lived in the village of Chen, though this is variously located in Laconia or Crete. He is also said to be "of Oeta", which seems to be a reference to Mount Oeta; but the reference is sometimes read as "Etea" instead, which again may have been in Laconia or else in Crete. He died at the age of 97.

In his Protagoras, Plato lists Myson of Chen as one of the Seven Sages of Greece, instead of Periander, who was claimed as one by Stobaeus, citing Demetrius of Phaleron as his authority. Eudoxus also lists Myson, but omits Cleobulus instead.

The Oracle of Delphi proclaimed Myson the wisest of all men when Anacharsis consulted it:

Myson of Chen in Oeta; this is he
Who for wiseheartedness surpasses thee;

== Quotations ==
"We should not investigate facts by the light of arguments, but arguments by the light of facts."
