= Seven Sages of Greece =

7th–6th century BCE group of philosophers

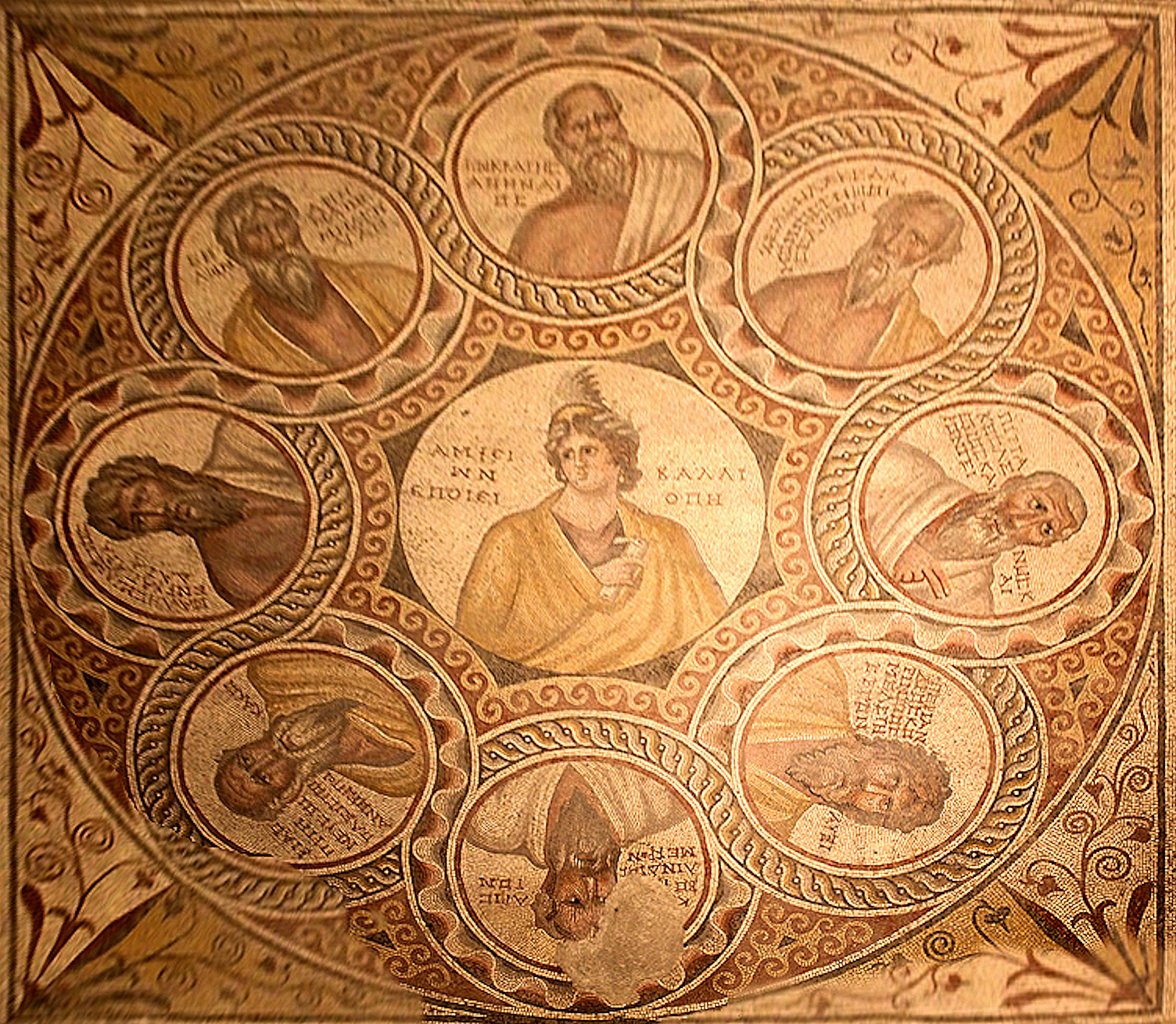
Mosaic of the Seven Sages, Baalbeck, Lebanon, 3rd century CE, National Museum of Beirut. Calliope at center and Socrates at the top, with the Seven Sages clockwise from the top: Chilon, Pittacus, Periander, Cleobulus (damaged section), Bias, Thales, and Solon.

The Seven Sages or, alternatively, the Seven Wise Men were the honorary title(s) given to seven philosophers, statesmen, and law-givers of the 7th–6th centuries BCE who were especially renowned for their wisdom.

== Seven Sages ==
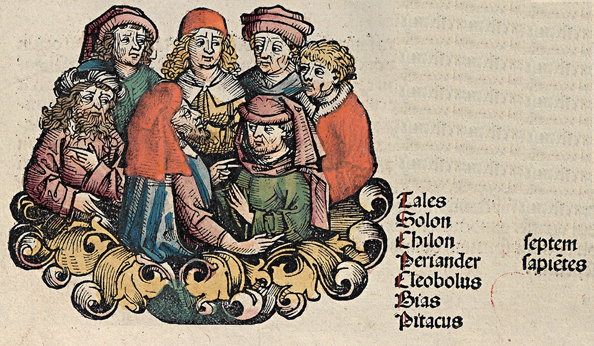
The Seven Sages (Latin: Septem Sapientes), depicted in the Nuremberg Chronicle

The list of the seven sages given in Plato's Protagoras comprises:

- Thales of Miletus (c. 624 BCE – c. 546 BCE) is the first well-known Greek philosopher, mathematician, and astronomer. The ancient biographer Diogenes Laertius attributes the aphorism, "Know thyself", engraved on the front facade of the Temple of Apollo in Delphi, to Thales, although there was no ancient consensus on this attribution.
- Pittacus of Mytilene (c. 640 BCE – c. 568 BCE) governed Mytilene (Lesbos). He tried to reduce the power of the nobility and was able to govern with the support of the common people, whom he favoured.
- Bias of Priene (fl. 6th century BCE) was a politician and legislator of the 6th century BCE.
- Solon of Athens (c. 638 BCE – c. 558 BCE) was a famous legislator and reformer from Athens, framing the laws that shaped the Athenian democracy.
- Cleobulus, tyrant of Lindos (fl. c. 600 BCE), reported as either the grandfather or father-in-law of Thales;
- Myson of Chenae (6th century BCE); and
- Chilon of Sparta (fl. 555 BCE) was a Spartan politician to whom the militarization of Spartan society was attributed.

Diogenes Laërtius points out, however, that there was among his sources great disagreement over which figures should be counted among the seven. Perhaps the two most common substitutions were to exchange Periander of Corinth or Anacharsis the Scythian for Myson. On Diogenes' first list of seven, which he introduces with the words "These men are acknowledged wise", Periander appears instead of Myson; the same substitution appears in The Masque of the Seven Sages by Ausonius. Both Ephorus and Plutarch (in his Banquet of the Seven Sages) substituted Anacharsis for Myson. Elsewhere, Plutarch claims that Epimenides the Phæstian "is counted the seventh wise man by those who would not admit Periander into the number". Diogenes Laërtius further states that Dicaearchus gave ten possible names, Hippobotus suggested twelve names, and Hermippus enumerated seventeen possible sages from which different people made different selections of seven. Leslie Kurke contends that "Aesop was a popular contender for inclusion in the group"; an epigram of the 6th century CE poet Agathias (Palatine Anthology 16.332) refers to a statue of the Seven Sages, with Aesop standing before them.

== Interpretations ==
In Plato's Protagoras, Socrates says:

There some, both at present and of old, who recognized that Spartanizing is much more a love of wisdom than a love of physical exercise, knowing that the ability to utter such [brief and terse] remarks belongs to a perfectly educated man. Among these were Thales of Miletus, and Pittacus of Mytilene, and Bias of Priene, and our own Solon, and Cleobulus of Lindus, and Myson of Chenae, and the seventh of them was said to be Chilon of Sparta. They all emulated and admired and were students of Spartan education, could tell their wisdom was of this sort by the brief but memorable remarks they each uttered when they met and jointly the first fruits of their wisdom to Apollo in his shrine at Delphi, writing what is on every man's lips: Know thyself, and Nothing too much. Why do I say this? Because this was the manner of philosophy among the ancients, a kind of laconic brevity.

The section of the Protagoras in which this passage appears is "elaborately ironical", making it unclear which of its parts may be taken seriously.

Diogenes Laërtius writes in his account of the life of Pyrrho, the founder of Pyrrhonism, that the Seven Sages of Greece were considered to be precursors of Pyrrho's philosophical skepticism because the Delphic Maxims were skeptical. "The maxims of the Seven Wise Men, too, they call skeptical; for instance, 'Observe the Golden Mean', and 'A pledge is a curse at one's elbow', meaning that whoever plights his troth steadfastly and trustfully brings a curse on his own head."

== Sources and legends ==
The oldest explicit mention on record of a standard list of seven sages is in Plato's Protagoras, quoted above.

Diogenes Laërtius reported that there were seven individuals who were held in high esteem for their wisdom well before Plato's time. According to Demetrius Phalereus, it was during the archonship of Damasias (582/81 BCE) that the seven first become known as "the wise men", Thales being the first so acknowledged.

Later tradition ascribed to each sage a pithy saying of his own, but ancient as well as modern scholars have doubted the legitimacy of such ascriptions. A compilation of 147 maxims, inscribed at Delphi, was preserved by the fifth century CE scholar Stobaeus as "Sayings of the Seven Sages", but "the actual authorship of the ... maxims set up on the Delphian temple may be left uncertain. Most likely they were popular proverbs, which tended later to be attributed to particular sages."

In addition to being credited for pithy sayings, the wise men were also apparently famed for practical inventions; in Plato's Republic (600a), it is said that it "befits a wise man" to have "many inventions and useful devices in the crafts or sciences" attributed to him, citing Thales and Anacharsis the Scythian as examples.

According to a number of moralistic stories, there was a golden tripod (or, in some versions of the story, a bowl or cup) which was to be given to the wisest. Allegedly, it passed in turn from one of the seven sages to another, beginning with Thales, until one of them (either Thales or Solon, depending on the story) finally dedicated it to Apollo who was held to be wisest of all.

According to Diogenes, Dicaearchus claimed that the seven "were neither wise men nor philosophers, but merely shrewd men, who had studied legislation." And according to at least one modern scholar, the claim is correct: "With the exception of Thales, no one whose life is contained in [Diogenes'] Book I [i.e. none of the above] has any claim to be styled a philosopher."

== See also ==
- Sage (philosophy)
- Saptarshi, seven seers of ancient India.
- Seven Sages of the Bamboo Grove, seven Chinese scholars and mystics
