= Cleobulus =

Greek poet

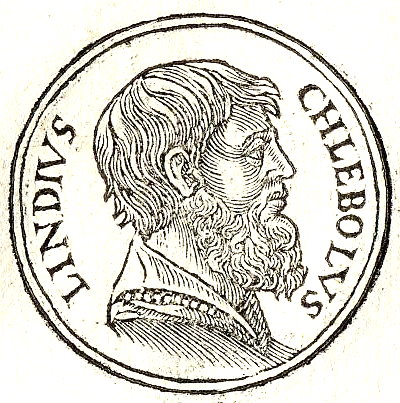
Cleobulus of Lindos

Cleobulus (/ˌklioʊˈbjuːləs, kliˈɒbjələs/; Greek: Κλεόβουλος ὁ Λίνδιος, Kleoboulos ho Lindios; fl. 6th century BC) was a Greek poet and a native of Lindos. He is one of the Seven Sages of Greece.

== Life ==
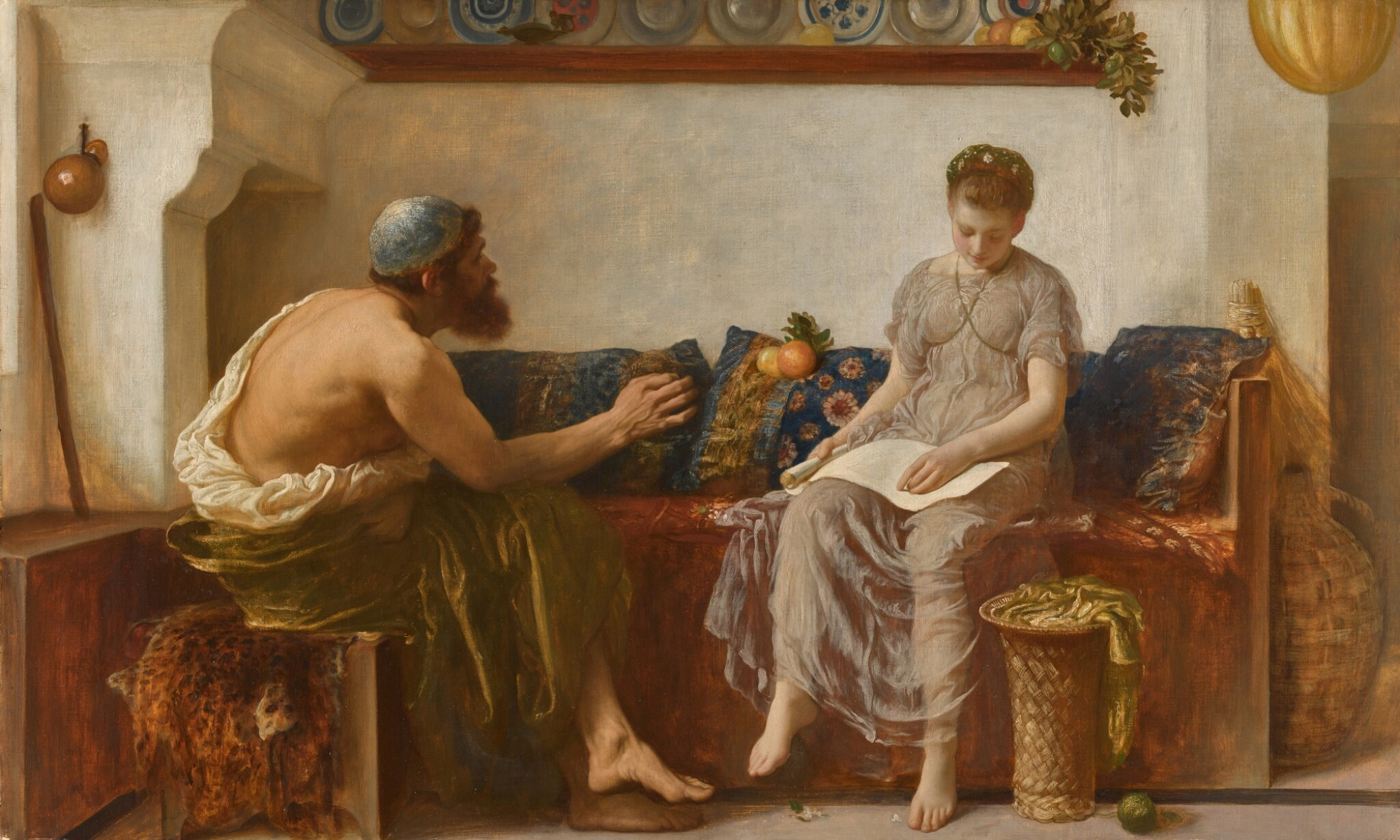
Cleoboulos instructing his daughter Cleobouline by 19th century artist Frederic Leighton

Cleobulus was the son of Evagoras and a citizen of Lindus in Rhodes. Clement of Alexandria called Cleobulus king of the Lindians, and Plutarch spoke of him as the tyrant. The letter quoted by Diogenes Laërtius, in which Cleobulus invites Solon to Lindus as a democratic place of refuge from the tyrant Peisistratus in Athens, is undoubtedly a later forgery. Cleobulus is also said to have studied philosophy in Egypt. He had a daughter, Cleobulina, who found fame as a poet, composing riddles in hexameter verse. Cleobulus is said to have lived to the age of seventy, and to have been greatly distinguished for strength and beauty of person.

== Extant fragments ==
Cleobulus apparently wrote lyric poems, as well as riddles in verse. Diogenes Laërtius also ascribes to him the inscription on the tomb of Midas, of which Homer was considered by others to have been the author:

I am a brazen maiden lying here
Upon the tomb of Midas. And as long
As water flows, as trees are green with leaves,
As the sun shines and eke the silver moon,
As long as rivers flow, and billows roar,
So long will I upon this much wept tomb,
Tell passers by, "Midas lies buried here."

The Suda mentions him, and farther down, his daughter Cleobulina. An epigram of his is in the Palatine Anthology (VII, 153), and in another place records two epigrams together as "One of Homer, or of Cleobulus", without specifying which is the latter's. French scholar Pierre Waltz analyzed the problem in the Anthologie Grecque Likewise an enigma attributed to him is recorded in the Palatine Anthology (XIV).

Many sayings were attributed to Cleobulus:

- "Ignorance and talkativeness bear the chief sway among men."
- "Cherish not a thought."
- "Do not be fickle, or ungrateful."
- "Be fond of hearing rather than of talking."
- "Be fond of learning rather than unwilling to learn."
- "Seek virtue and eschew vice."
- "Be superior to pleasure."
- "Instruct one's children."
- "Be ready for reconciliation after quarrels."
- "Avoid injustice."
- "Do nothing by force."
- "Moderation is the best thing."

== Legacy ==
There is a stone tumulus on the northern headland of Lindos bay, which is sometimes called the "Tomb of Cleobulus".

An asteroid, 4503 Cleobulus, discovered in 1989, is named for him.
