= Pittacus of Mytilene =

Ancient Greek philosopher and politician

Pittacus
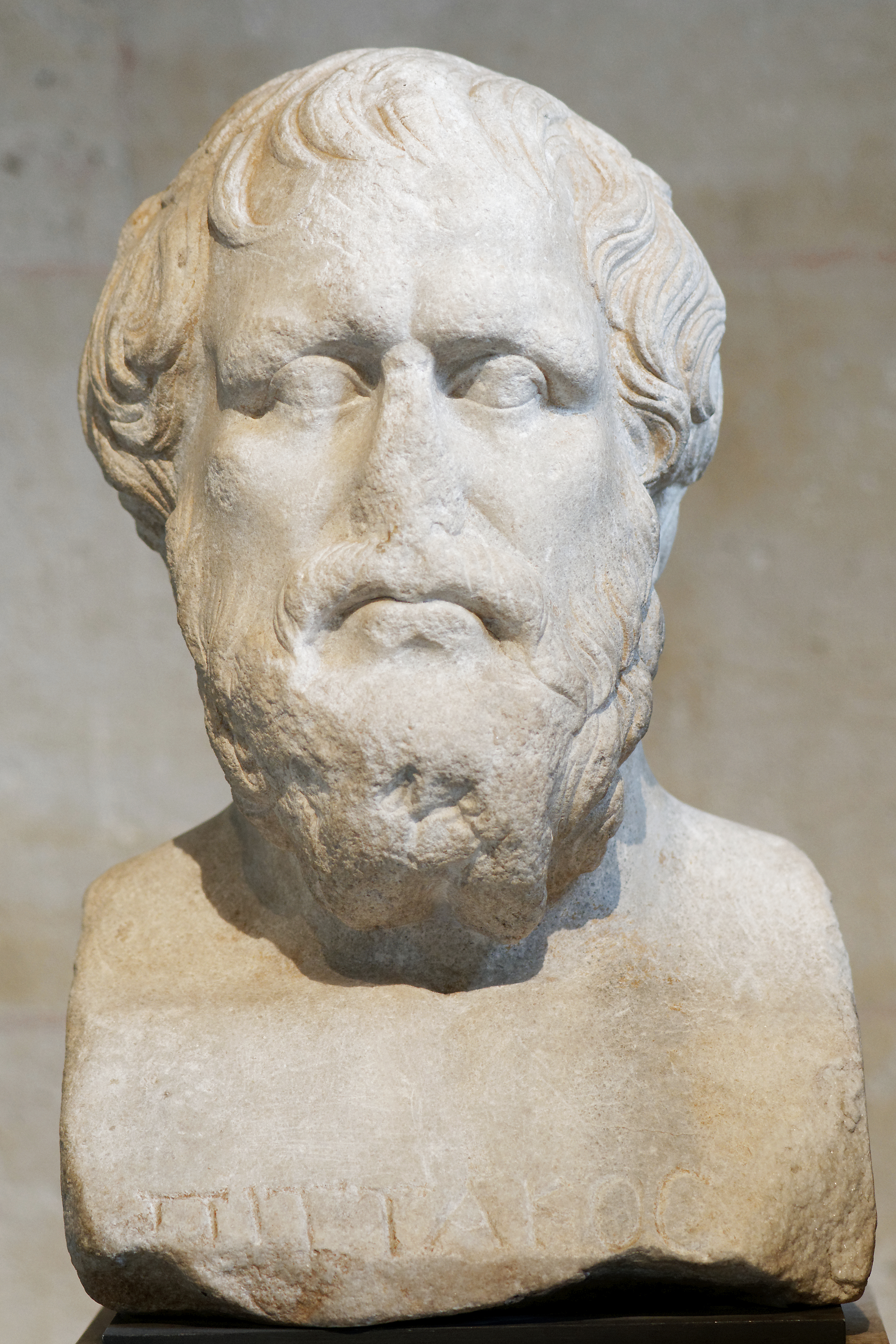
- Bust of Pittacus, Roman copy of a Greek original of the Late Classical period, Louvre
- Born: c. 650 BC; Mytilene
- Died: c. 570 BC

Pittacus of Mytilene (/ˈpɪtəkəs/; Ancient Greek: Πιττακός; c. 650 – c. 570 BC) was a military general and one of the Seven Sages of Greece.

== Biography ==
Pittacus was a native of Mytilene and son of Hyrradius. He became a Mytilenaean general who, with his army, was victorious in the battle against the Athenians and their commander Phrynon. In consequence of this victory, the Mytilenaeans held Pittacus in the greatest honour and presented the supreme power into his hands. After ten years of reign, he resigned his position and the city and constitution were brought into good order.

When the Athenians were about to attack Sigeion, Pittacus challenged their general to a single combat, with the understanding that the result should decide the war, and much bloodshed be thereby avoided. The challenge was accepted, and he killed his enemy with a broad sword. He was then chosen ruler of his city and governed for ten years, during which time he made laws in poetry, one of which was to this effect: "A crime committed by a person when drunk should receive double the punishment that it would merit if the offender were sober." His great motto was this: "Whatever you do, do it well."

Polyaenus in his Stratagems wrote that Pittacus had secretly concealed a net under his shield. He caught Phrynon with the net, dragged him down and killed him. According to Polyaenus, this stratagem of Pittacus gave rise to the use of nets in duels between gladiators.

Some authors mention that he had a son called Tyrrhaeus. The legend says that his son was killed and when the murderer was brought before Pittacus, he dismissed the man and said, "Pardon is better than repentance." Of this matter, Heraclitus says that he had the murderer into his power and then released him, saying, "Pardon is better than punishment."

Pittacus said that "[It] is a hard thing to be a good man." In Plato's Protagoras, Socrates discusses this saying at length with Protagoras, and Prodicus of Ceos calls "barbarian" the Aeolic dialect that Pittacus spoke: "He didn't know to distinguish the words correctly, being from Lesbos, and having been raised with a barbarian dialect."

He flourished around the forty-second Olympiad. Having lived for more than seventy years, he died in the third year of the fifty-second Olympiad (568 BC).

Plutarch mentions Pittacus in "Symposiakon ton hepta sophon" (Septem Sapientium Convivium), Chapter 14, when a woman doing manual grinding asks the mill to grind since even Pittacus does the same thing (grinding).

== Writings ==
The Suda claims that Pittacus wrote a prose work about laws and also an elegiac poem of 600 lines. No trace of these works has survived.

== Legal reform ==
Pittacus instituted a law stating that crimes committed in drunkenness should be punished twofold; that was directed predominantly against the aristocrats, who were more often guilty of drunk and violent behaviour. As such, it was greatly appreciated by the common people.

== Other sayings ==
- "Forgiveness is better than revenge: for that [viz., forgiveness] belongs to a benevolent nature; this [viz., revenge] to a savage."
- "Whatever you do, do it well."
- "Even the gods cannot strive against necessity."
- "Power shows the man."
- "Do not say beforehand what you are going to do; for if you fail, you will be laughed at."
- "Do not reproach a man with his misfortunes, fearing lest Nemesis may overtake you."
- "Forbear to speak evil not only of your friends, but also of your enemies."
- "Cultivate truth, good faith, experience, cleverness, sociability, and industry."
- "Know thine opportunity."

== Sources ==
- Laërtius, Diogenes. "The Seven Sages: Pittacus" . Lives of the Eminent Philosophers. Vol. 1:1. Translated by Hicks, Robert Drew (Two volume ed.). Loeb Classical Library.
- Burton, H. W. (1877). The History of Norfolk, Virginia. Norfolk, VA: Norfolk Virginian Job Print. p. 244.
- Given, Charles Stewart (1905). A Fleece of Gold: Five Lessons from the Fable of Jason and the Golden Fleece. Cincinnati, OH: Jennings & Graham.
