= Priene calendar inscription =

9 BC stone inscription about Augustus Caesar

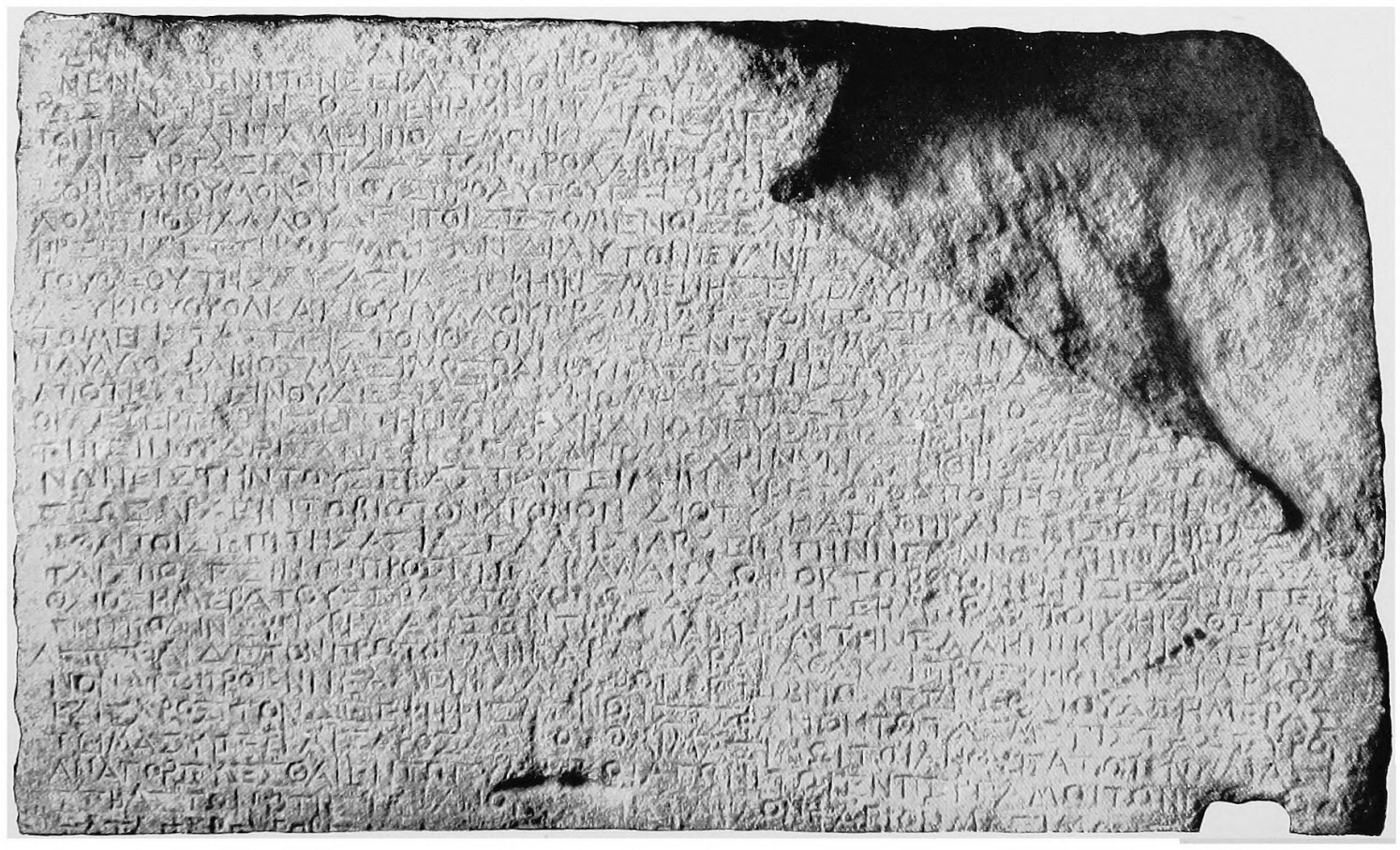
Second part of the calendar inscription of Priene

The Priene calendar inscription (IK Priene 14) is an inscription in stone recovered at Priene (an ancient Greek city, in Western Turkey) that records an edict by Paullus Fabius Maximus, proconsul of the Roman province of Asia and a decree of the conventus of the province accepting the edict from 9 BC. The documents align the provincial calendar with the Roman calendar, honouring Augustus by making the provincial year begin on his birthday. It refers to Augustus' birth using the term "gospel." It is known as the Priene text because it was found on two stones in the marketplace of the ancient town of Priene. Other copies are known from Apamea and Eumeneia.

The Greek text of the whole inscription has been published several times and the current authoritative edition appears as inscription no. 14 in the Priene volume of the Inschriften griechischer Städte aus Kleinasien series. It consists of two distinct parts: The edict, and the decree of acceptance of the edict. Although the inscription spans two stones, the second part begins before the end of the first stone.

The calendar inscription of Priene is currently in the Bibelhaus Erlebnis Museum in Frankfurt and will be through September 2023, on loan from Berlin Museum.

== Reference to "gospel" ==
The inscription features the Greek term εὐαγγέλιον, evangelion, meaning "good news," which is the term translated into English as "gospel". The reference occurs in a section of the text recording a speech by the high priest of the conventus, Apollonius of Azania in Caria:

It seemed good to the Greeks of Asia, in the opinion of the high priest Apollonius of Menophilus Azanitus: “Since Providence, which has ordered all things and is deeply interested in our life, has set in most perfect order by giving us Augustus, whom she filled with virtue that he might benefit humankind, sending him as a savior, both for us and for our descendants, that he might end war and arrange all things, and since he, Caesar, by his appearance (excelled even our anticipations), surpassing all previous benefactors, and not even leaving to posterity any hope of surpassing what he has done, and since the birthday of the god Augustus was the beginning of the good tidings [εὐαγγέλιον] for the world that came by reason of him,” which Asia resolved in Smyrna.

As exemplified in the Calendar Inscription of Priene, this Koine Greek term εὐαγγέλιον was used at the time of the Roman Empire to spread imperial propaganda. The Calendar Inscription of Priene speaks of the birthday of Caesar Augustus as good message ("eu-angelion"), with a Roman decree to start a new calendar system based on the year of Augustus Caesar's birth. Some Christian historians have compared this with the opening of the Gospel of Mark: "The beginning of the gospel of Jesus Christ, the Son of God." Mark 1:1

== See also ==
- Priene Inscription
