= Priene inscription =

Priene inscription may refer to:

- Priene inscription of Alexander the Great (c. 330 BC)
- Alexander the Great's edict to Priene (334 BC, but inscribed in the 280s BC)
- Priene calendar inscription (AD 9)
