= List of Stoic philosophers =

This is a list of Stoic philosophers, ordered (roughly) by date. The criteria for inclusion in this list are fairly mild. See also Category:Stoic philosophers.

Name	Period	Notes
	3rd Century BC	
Zeno of Citium	(c. 334 – 262 BC)	Founder of the Stoic school in Athens (c. 300 BC)
Persaeus	(306–243 BC)	Pupil and friend of Zeno
Aratus of Soli	(c. 315 – c. 245 BC)	Pupil of Zeno and poet
Athenodorus of Soli	fl. 275 BC	Pupil of Zeno and brother of Aratus
Aristo of Chios	(c. 310 – c. 240 BC)	Pupil of Crates, leaned towards Cynicism
Apollophanes of Antioch	(fl. 250 BC)	Stoic philosopher, friend of Aristo of Chios
Dionysius the Renegade	(c. 325 – c. 250 BC)	Pupil of Zeno who became a Cyrenaic
Sphaerus	(c. 285 – c. 210 BC)	Pupil of Zeno – moved to Sparta and Alexandria
Herillus of Carthage	(fl. 250 BC)	Pupil of Zeno, who held that knowledge was the highest good
Cleanthes	(of Assos) [331–232 BC]	Second leader of the Stoic school
Eratosthenes (of Cyrene)	(fl. 225 BC)	Pupil of Aristo. Chief librarian at Alexandria
Hermagoras of Amphipolis	fl. c. 225 BC	Stoic philosopher and follower of Persaeus of Citium
Chrysippus (of Soli)	(c. 280 – c. 206 BC)	Third leader of the Stoic school. Wrote 705 books
Dioscorides (Stoic)	(fl. 225 BC)	Pupil of Chrysippus. Father of Zeno of Tarsus
Aristocreon	(fl. 210 BC)	Nephew of Chrysippus
	2nd Century BC	
Zeno of Tarsus	(fl. 200 BC)	Fourth leader of the Stoic school
Crates of Mallus	(fl. 175 BC)	Grammarian. Head of the library at Pergamon
Diogenes of Babylon	(c. 230 – c. 150 BC)	Fifth leader of the Stoic school
Zenodotus (Stoic)	(fl. 150 BC)	Pupil of Diogenes of Tite
Apollodorus of Seleucia	(fl. 150 BC)	Pupil of Diogenes of Babylon
Basilides (Stoic)	(fl. c. 150 BC)	Denied the existence of incorporeal entities
Antipater of Tarsus	(c. 200 – 129 BC)	Sixth leader of the Stoic school
Apollodorus of Athens	(fl. 150 BC)	Historian. Pupil of Diogenes and Antipater of Tarsus
Archedemus of Tarsus	(fl. 140 BC)	Founded a Stoic school at Babylon
Panaetius of Rhodes	(185–109 BC)	Seventh and last undisputed leader of the Stoic school
Boethus of Sidon	(fl. 150 BC)	Pupil of Diogenes
Polemon of Athens	(fl. 150 BC)	Geographer, follower of Panaetius
Gaius Blossius	(fl. 133 BC)	Pupil of Antipater of Tarsus, insurgent of in the revolt of Aristonikos
Marcus Vigellius	(fl. 125 BC)	Stoic who lived with Panaetius
Heraclides of Tarsus	(fl. 125 BC)	Pupil of Antipater of Tarsus
Dardanus	(c. 160–c. 90 BC)	Leading figure in the Stoic school in Athens
Mnesarchus	(c. 160–c. 90 BC)	Leading figure in the Stoic school in Athens
Publius Rutilius Rufus	(158 – c. 75 BC)	Statesman, orator and historian. Pupil of Panaetius
Stilo	(c. 154 – 74 BC)	Grammarian and scholar
Dionysius of Cyrene	(fl. c. 125 BC)	Leading figure in the Stoic school in Athens
Quintus Lucilius Balbus	(fl. c. 125 BC)	Stoic philosopher, and a pupil of Panaetius
Hecato of Rhodes	(fl. 100 BC)	Pupil of Panaetius, wrote about ethics
Diotimus the Stoic	(fl. 100 BC)	Stoic who slandered Epicurus
	1st Century BC	
Posidonius (of Apamea)	(c. 135 – 51 BC)	A philosopher, astronomer, and geographer
Crinis	(fl. uncertain)	Stoic who wrote about logic
Proclus of Mallus	(fl. uncertain)	Stoic philosopher and writer
Diodotus the Stoic	(c. 130 – 59 BC)	Stoic teacher of Cicero who lived in Cicero's house
Geminus of Rhodes	(c. 110 – c. 40 BC)	Astronomer and mathematician
Athenodoros Cordylion	(c. 130 – 60 BC)	Librarian at Pergamon, lived with Cato
Apollonius of Tyre (philosopher)	(fl. 50 BC)	Stoic philosopher who wrote a biography of Zeno
Cato the Younger	(95–46 BC)	Statesman who opposed Julius Caesar
Antipater of Tyre	(c. 100 – 45 BC)	Friend of Cato. Wrote about practical ethics
Porcia Catonis	(c. 70 – 43 BC)	Female Stoic, daughter of Cato the Younger
Apollonides	(fl. 46 BC)	Stoic philosopher whom Cato consulted, before committing suicide
Jason of Nysa	(fl. 50 BC)	Grandson of Posidonius
Athenodoros Cananites	(c. 74 BC – 7 AD)	Pupil of Posidonius. Teacher of Augustus
Quintus Sextius	(fl. 40 BC)	Set up a school, teaching Stoicism mixed with Pythagoreanism
Arius Didymus (of Alexandria)	(fl. 10 BC)	Collected excerpts from earlier Stoic writers
	1st Century AD	
Attalus (Stoic)	(fl. 25 AD)	Stoic philosopher frequently visited by Seneca
Papirius Fabianus	(fl. 30 AD)	Teacher of Seneca. Rhetorician and philosopher
Lucius Annaeus Seneca	(c. 4 BC – 65 AD)	Statesman, philosopher and playwright. Many of his works are extant
Thrasea Paetus	(c. 10 AD – 66 AD)	Roman senator and Stoic
Lucius Annaeus Cornutus	(c. 20 – c. 70 AD)	Stoic teacher who wrote a Compendium of Greek Theology
Chaeremon of Alexandria	(fl. 50 AD)	Stoic philosopher and grammarian. Librarian at Alexandria
Paconius Agrippinus	(fl. 60 AD)	Stoic philosopher spoken of with praise by Epictetus
Publius Egnatius Celer	(fl. 60 AD)	Stoic philosopher. Informer in the reign of Nero
Persius	(34–62 AD)	Stoic philosopher, poet and satirist
Helvidius Priscus	(fl. 65 AD)	Stoic philosopher and statesman
Arulenus Rusticus	(c. 30 – 93 AD)	Statesman. Friend and pupil of Thrasea Paetus
Musonius Rufus	(c. 25 – c. 90 AD)	Taught Epictetus. Some of his lectures are extant
Fannia	(c. 100 AD)	Another female Stoic
Euphrates the Stoic	(c. 35 – 118 AD)	Philosopher, orator and pupil of Musonius Rufus
	2nd Century AD	
Epictetus (of Hierapolis)	(c. 55 – c. 135 AD)	Pupil of Musonius Rufus. His Discourses and Enchiridion are extant
Hierocles (Stoic)	(fl. 150 AD)	Philosopher, who wrote "Elements of Ethics"
Flavius Arrianus	(c. 90 – 175 AD)	Historian and pupil of Epictetus
Basilides of Scythopolis	(fl. 150 AD)	Teacher of Marcus Aurelius
Apollonius of Chalcedon	(fl. 150 AD)	Stoic teacher of Marcus Aurelius and Lucius Verus
Claudius Maximus	(fl. 150 AD)	Stoic philosopher and friend of Marcus Aurelius
Junius Rusticus	(c. 100 – c. 170 AD)	Philosopher and Consul. Adviser of Marcus Aurelius
Marcus Aurelius	(121–180 AD)	Roman Emperor from 161 to 180 AD. His philosophical notebook, Meditations, is extant
Medius (Stoic)	(fl. 250 AD)	He debated the Stoic theory of the eight parts of the soul with Cassius Longinus (rhetorician).

== See also ==
- List of ancient Greek philosophers
- List of ancient Platonists
- List of Cynic philosophers
- List of Epicurean philosophers
