= Ancient Roman philosophy =

Philosophy in the Roman world, influenced by Hellenistic philosophy

Ancient Roman philosophy is philosophy as it was practiced in the Roman Republic and its successor state, the Roman Empire. Roman philosophy includes philosophy written in Latin as well as philosophy written in Greek in the late Republic and Roman Empire. Important early Latin-language writers include Lucretius, Cicero, and Seneca the Younger. Greek was a popular language for writing about philosophy, so much so that the Roman Emperor Marcus Aurelius chose to write his Meditations in Greek.

== History ==
Interest in philosophy was first shown at Rome in 155 BC by an Athenian embassy consisting of the Academic skeptic Carneades, the Stoic Diogenes of Babylon, and the Peripatetic Critolaus. Roman philosophy was heavily influenced by Hellenistic philosophy; however, unique developments in philosophical schools of thought occurred during the Roman period as well, with many philosophers adapting teachings from more than one school. Both leading schools of law of the Roman period, the Sabinian and the Proculean Schools, drew their ethical views from readings on the Stoics and Epicureans respectively, allowing for the competition between thought to manifest in a new field in Rome's jurisprudence.

During the autocratic rule of the Flavian dynasty, a group of philosophers vocally and politically protested against imperial actions, particularly under Domitian and Vespasian. This resulted in Vespasian banishing all philosophers from Rome, save for Gaius Musonius Rufus, although he too was later banished. This event later became known as the Stoic Opposition, as a majority of the protesting philosophers were Stoics. Later in the Roman period, Stoics came to regard this opposition highly; however, the term "Stoic Opposition" was not coined until the 19th century, where it first appears in the writings of Gaston Boissier.

While philosophy was often admired by jurists and aristocrats, of the emperors the affinity that Hadrian held for philosophy stands out, a feature that was likely amplified by his philhellenism. Hadrian was recorded to have attended lectures by Epictetus and Favorinus on his tours of Greece, and he invested heavily in attempting to revive Athens as a cultural center in the ancient world through methods of central planning on his part. Hadrian held philosophy in high esteem an attitude uncommon among Roman emperors, who were often indifferent or even hostile toward it as a discipline. These sentiments in favor of philosophy were also shared by the emperors Nero, Julian the Apostate, and Marcus Aurelius the latter two of whom are now considered as philosophers.

Later, with the spread of Christianity inside the Roman Empire, came the Christian philosophy of Augustine of Hippo. One of the last philosophical writers of antiquity was Boethius, whose writings are the chief source of information as to Greek philosophy during the first centuries of the Middle Ages. During this time Athens declined as an intellectual center of thought while new sites such as Alexandria and Rome hosted a variety of philosophical discussion, such as commentary on the works of Aristotle.

== Schools of thought ==
=== Middle Platonism ===
Around 90 BC, Antiochus of Ascalon rejected skepticism, making way for the period known as Middle Platonism, in which Platonism was fused with certain Peripatetic and many Stoic dogmas. In Middle Platonism, the Platonic Forms were not transcendent but immanent to rational minds, and the physical world was a living, ensouled being, the world-soul. The eclectic nature of Platonism during this time is shown by its incorporation into Pythagoreanism (Numenius of Apamea) and into Jewish philosophy (Philo of Alexandria).

=== School of the Sextii ===
The School of the Sextii was an eclectic Ancient Roman school of philosophy founded around 50 BC by Quintus Sextius and continued by his son, Sextius Niger, however it went extinct shortly after in 19 AD due to the ban on foreign cults. The school blended elements of Pythagorean, Platonic, Cynic, and Stoic together with a belief in an elusive incorporeal power pervades the body in order to emphasize asceticism, honesty, and moral training through nightly examinations of conscience as a means of achieving eudaimonia. The primary sources of information on the school are Seneca the Younger, who was taught by one of its members named Sotion, and the 5th century writer Claudianus Mamertus. Other members of the school included Papirius Fabianus, Crassicius Pasicles, Celsus. While Seneca the Younger often conflates the school with Stoicism, the Sextians were not as inclined to rigorous logical exercises or any abstruse abstract thinking, and unlike the Stoics, advocated avoidance of politics, engaging in the correspondence between words and life, and vegetarianism.

=== Neopythagoreanism ===
Pythagorean views were revived by Nigidius Figulus during the Hellenistic period, when pseudo-pythagorean writings began circulating. Eventually in the 1st and 2nd centuries AD Neopythagoreanism came to be recognized. The school was propagated by Secundus the Silent and Iamblichus.

=== Epicureanism ===
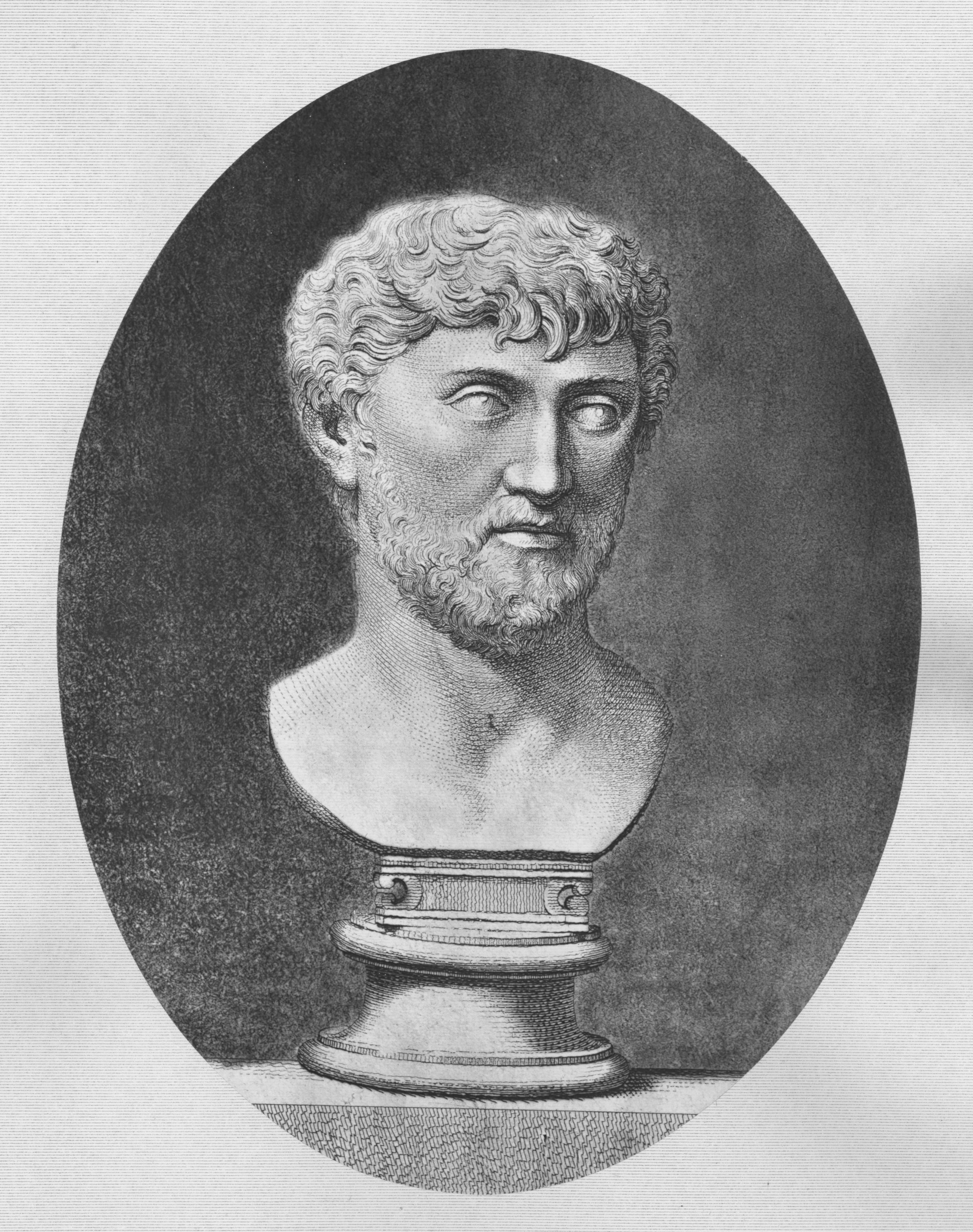
Roman Epicurean philosopher, Lucretius

- Zeno of Sidon (150–75 BC)
- Alcaeus and Philiscus (150 BC)
- Phaedrus (138–70 BC)
- Gaius Amafinius (125 BC)
- Titus Pomponius Atticus (110 BC–33 BC)
- Philodemus (110–50 BC)
- Titus Albucius (105 BC)
- Rabirius (100 BC)
- Patro (70 BC)
- Siro (50 BC)
- Catius (50 BC)
- Lucretius (94–55 BC)

=== Roman stoics ===
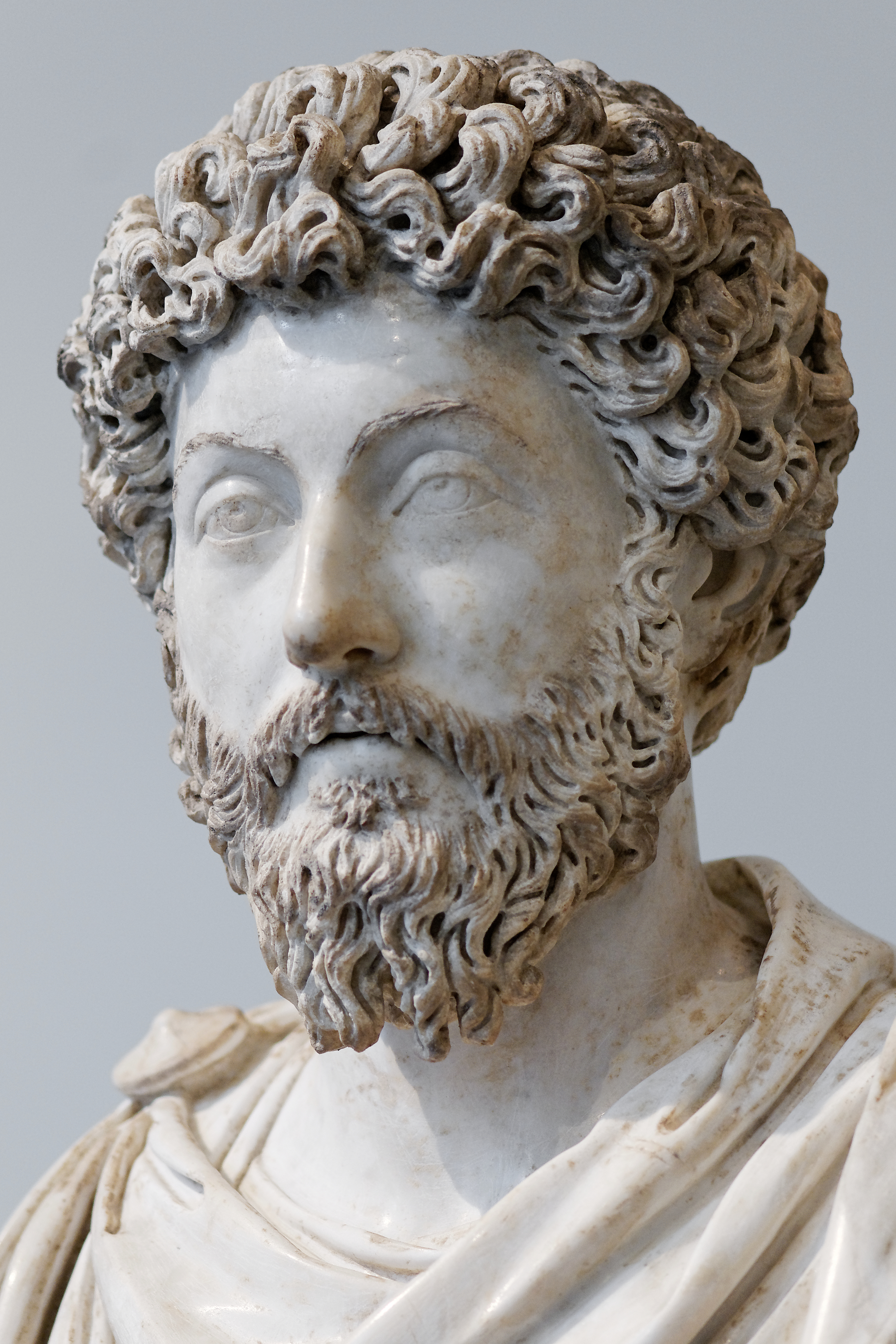
Roman emperor and Stoic philosopher, Marcus Aurelius

- Publius Rutillius Rufus (158–75 BC)
- Lucius Aelius Stilo Praeconinus (154–74 BC)
- Diodotus the Stoic (130–59 BC)
- Marcus Vigellius (125 BC)
- Quintus Lucilius Balbus (125 BC)
- Antipater of Tyre (100–45BC)
- Cato the Younger (95–46 BC)
- Porcia Catonis (70–43 BC)
- Apollonides (46 BC)
- Quintus Sextius the Elder (40 BC)
- Seneca the Younger (4 BC – 65 AD)
- Attalus (25 AD)
- Papirius Fabianus (30 AD)
- Musonius Rufus (30–100 AD)
- Epictetus (55–135 AD)
- Marcus Aurelius (121–180 AD)

=== Skepticism ===
Academic skeptic

- Cicero (106 – 43 BC)

Philosophical skepticism

- Favorinus

Pyrrhonist

- Theodas of Laodicea (2nd century AD)
- Menodotus of Nicomedia (2nd century AD)
- Sextus Empiricus (2nd century AD)

=== Cynicism ===
Cynic philosophy survived into the Imperial period, and even became "fashionable", though its adherents were criticized for not being fully committed.

- Demetrius the Cynic

=== Late Peripatetic ===
- Alexander of Aphrodisias (3rd century AD)

=== Neoplatonism ===
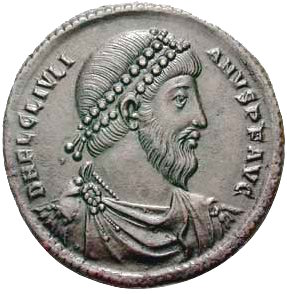
Roman emperor and Neoplatonic philosopher, Julian

Neoplatonism, or Plotinism, is a school of religious and mystical philosophy founded by Plotinus in the 3rd century AD and based on the teachings of Plato and the other Platonists. The summit of existence was the One or the Good, the source of all things. In virtue and meditation the soul had the power to elevate itself to attain union with the One, the true function of human beings. Non-Christian Neoplatonists used to attack Christianity until Christians such as Augustine, Boethius, and Eriugena adopted Neoplatonism.

- Plotinus (205 – 278AD)
- Amelius Gentilianus (3rd century AD)
- Porphyry (232 – 304 AD)
- Julian (331 – 363 AD)
- Iamblichus (242 – 327 AD)
- Damascius (462 – 540 AD)
- Simplicius of Cilicia (490 – 560 AD)
- Boethius (472 – 524 AD)

=== Early Christian philosophy ===
- Clement of Alexandria (150 – 215 AD)
- Augustine of Hippo (354 – 430 AD)
