= Basilides (disambiguation) =

Basilides (Ancient Greek: Βασιλείδης) was a Christian gnostic who taught in Alexandria from 117 to 138 AD.

Basilides or Basileides may also refer to:

- Basilides the Epicurean, (250 – c. 175 BC), philosopher
- Basilides of Tyre, mathematician
- Basilides (Stoic) (2nd century BC), philosopher
- Basilides, possibly fictional 1st-century Roman prophet, and subject of The Prophecy of Basilides
- Basilides of Scythopolis (fl. 150), teacher of Marcus Aurelius
- Basilides and Potamiana (died c. 205), Christian martyrs now venerated as saints
- Basilides (bishop of Ptolemais), 3rd century bishop and correspondent of Pope Dionysius of Alexandria
- Basilides, Cyrinus, Nabor and Nazarius (died c. 303), Catholic saints
- Basilides (patricius), (c. 527–565) Byzantine official who helped the emperor Justinian I compile the Corpus Juris Civilis
- Basilides (grammarian), grammarian of the late antique period
- Fasilides or Basilides (1603–1667), emperor of Ethiopia
- Mária Basilides, (1886–1946), Hungarian contralto singer

== See also ==
- Gospel of Basilides, a text within the New Testament apocrypha
