= Diogenes Laertius =

3rd-century Roman biographer of Greek philosophers

Diogenes Laërtius
- Διογένης Λαέρτιος
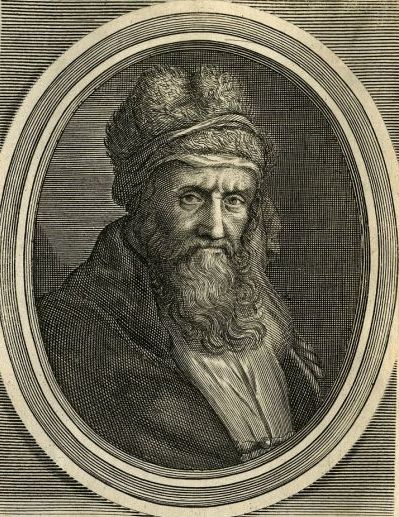
- 1688 engraving of Diogenes Laërtius

Diogenes Laërtius (/daɪˌɒdʒɪniːz leɪˈɜːrʃiəs/ dy-OJ-in-eez lay-UR-shee-əs; Ancient Greek: Διογένης Λαέρτιος, romanized: Diogénēs Laértios, IPA: [di.o.ɡé.nɛːs laː.ér.ti.os]; fl. 3rd century CE) was a biographer of the Greek philosophers. Little is definitively known about his life, but his surviving work, Lives and Opinions of Eminent Philosophers, remains a primary source for the history of ancient Greek philosophy. His reputation is controversial among scholars because he often repeats information from his sources without critically evaluating it. In many cases, he focuses on insignificant details of his subjects' lives while ignoring important details of their philosophical teachings and he sometimes fails to distinguish between earlier and later teachings of specific philosophical schools. However, unlike many other ancient secondary sources, Diogenes Laërtius tends to report philosophical teachings without trying to reinterpret or expand on them, and so his accounts are often closer to the primary sources. Due to the loss of so many of the primary sources on which Diogenes relied, his work has become the foremost surviving source on the history of Greek philosophy.

== Life ==
Laërtius must have lived after Sextus Empiricus (c. 200), whom he mentions, and before Sopater of Apamea (c. 300), who quotes him. Hence he is assumed to have flourished in the first half of the 3rd century, during the reign of Alexander Severus (222–235) and his successors.

The precise form of his name is uncertain. The ancient manuscripts invariably refer to a "Laertius Diogenes", and this form of the name is repeated by Sopater and the Suda. The modern form "Diogenes Laertius" is much rarer, used by Stephanus of Byzantium, and in a lemma to the Greek Anthology. He is also referred to as "Laertes" or simply "Diogenes".

The origin of the name "Laertius" is also uncertain. Stephanus of Byzantium refers to him as "Διογένης ὁ Λαερτιεύς" (Diogénēs ho Laertieús), implying that he was the native of some town, perhaps the Laerte in Caria (or another Laerte in Cilicia). Another suggestion is that one of his ancestors had for a patron a member of the Roman family of the Laërtii. The prevailing modern theory is that "Laertius" is a nickname (derived from the Homeric epithet Diogenés Laertiádē, used in addressing Odysseus) used to distinguish him from the many other people called Diogenes in the ancient world.

His home town is unknown (at best uncertain, even according to a hypothesis that Laertius refers to his origin). He refers to "himself" as the member of several different schools, but this is because he uncritically copies from his sources. It is by no means certain that he adhered to any school, and he is usually more attentive to biographical details.

In the Lives, Diogenes frequently includes epigrams he had written about famous men.

== Lives and Opinions of Eminent Philosophers ==
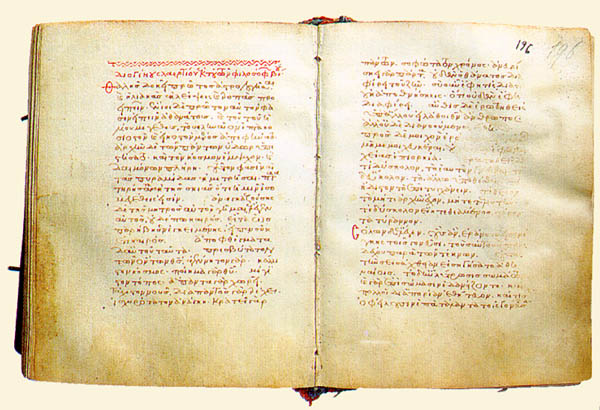
Dionysiou monastery, codex 90, a 13th-century manuscript containing selections from Herodotus, Plutarch and (shown here) Diogenes Laertius

The work by which he is known, Lives and Opinions of Eminent Philosophers (Ancient Greek: Βίοι καὶ γνῶμαι τῶν ἐν φιλοσοφίᾳ εὐδοκιμησάντων; Latin: Vitae Philosophorum), was written in Greek and professes to give an account of the lives and opinions of the Greek philosophers.

Although it is at best an uncritical and unphilosophical compilation, its value, as giving us an insight into the private lives of the Greek sages, led Montaigne to write that he wished that instead of one Laërtius there had been a dozen. On the other hand, modern scholars have advised that we treat Diogenes's testimonia with care, especially when he fails to cite his sources: "Diogenes has acquired an importance out of all proportion to his merits because the loss of many primary sources and of the earlier secondary compilations has accidentally left him the chief continuous source for the history of Greek philosophy".

=== Organization of the work ===
Diogenes divides his subjects into two "schools" which he describes as the Ionian/Ionic and the Italian/Italic; the division is somewhat dubious and appears to be drawn from the lost doxography of Sotion. The biographies of the "Ionian school" begin with Anaximander and end with Clitomachus, Theophrastus and Chrysippus; the "Italian" begins with Pythagoras and ends with Epicurus. The Socratic school, with its various branches, is classed with the Ionic; while the Eleatics and Pyrrhonists are treated under the Italian. He also includes his own poetic verse about the philosophers he discusses.

The following list shows the organization of philosophers discussed in the work:

Books 1–7: Ionian Philosophy
Book 1: The Seven Sages
Thales, Solon, Chilon, Pittacus, Bias, Cleobulus, Periander, Anacharsis, Myson, Epimenides, Pherecydes
Book 2: Ionians, Socrates, Socratics (Cyrenaics, Megarians)
Anaximander, Anaximenes, Anaxagoras, Archelaus, Socrates, Xenophon, Aeschines, Aristippus, Hegesias, Anniceris, Theodorus, Phaedo, Euclides, Eubulides, Alexinus, Euphantus, Diodorus Cronus, Stilpo, Crito, Simon, Glaucon, Simmias, Cebes, Menedemus of Eretria
Book 3: Plato
Plato
Book 4: The Academics
Speusippus, Xenocrates, Polemo, Crates of Athens, Crantor, Arcesilaus, Bion, Lacydes, Carneades, Clitomachus
Book 5: The Peripatetics
Aristotle, Theophrastus, Strato, Lyco, Demetrius, Heraclides
Book 6: The Cynics
Antisthenes, (Note: This school affilitation is considered incorrect by modern scholarship) Diogenes of Sinope, Monimus, Onesicritus, Crates of Thebes, Metrocles, Hipparchia, Menippus, Menedemus
Book 7: The Stoics
Zeno of Citium, Persaeus, Aristo, Herillus, Dionysius, Cleanthes, Sphaerus, Chrysippus
Books 8–10: "Italian" Philosophy
Book 8: Pythagoreans
Pythagoras, Theano, Empedocles, Epicharmus, Archytas, Alcmaeon, Hippasus, Philolaus, Eudoxus
Book 9: Unaffiliated, Eleatics, Atomists, Pyrrho and Pyrrhonians
Heraclitus, Xenophanes, Parmenides, Melissus, Zeno of Elea, Leucippus, Democritus, Protagoras, Diogenes of Apollonia, Anaxarchus, Pyrrho, Timon
Book 10: Epicurus and the Epicureans
Epicurus, Metrodorus and Hermarchus

Book VII is incomplete and breaks off during the life of Chrysippus. From a table of contents in one of the manuscripts (manuscript P), this book is known to have continued with Zeno of Tarsus, Diogenes, Apollodorus, Boethus, Mnesarchus, Mnasagoras, Nestor, Basilides, Dardanus, Antipater, Heraclides, Sosigenes, Panaetius, Hecato, Posidonius, Athenodorus, another Athenodorus, Antipater, Arius, and Cornutus.

His chief authorities were Favorinus and Diocles of Magnesia, but his work also draws (either directly or indirectly) on books by Antisthenes of Rhodes, Alexander Polyhistor, and Demetrius of Magnesia, as well as works by Hippobotus, Aristippus, Panaetius, Apollodorus of Athens, Sosicrates, Satyrus, Sotion, Neanthes, Hermippus, Antigonus, Heraclides, Hieronymus, and Pamphila.

=== Textual tradition ===
==== Manuscripts ====
There are many extant manuscripts of the Lives, although none of them are especially old, and they all lack the end of Book VII. The three most useful manuscripts are known as B, P, and F. Manuscript B (Codex Borbonicus) dates from the 12th century, and is in the National Library of Naples. (Note: The statement by Robert Hicks (1925) that "the scribe obviously knew no Greek", was later rejected by Herbert Long. The more recent opinion of Tiziano Dorandi, however, is that the scribe had "little knowledge of Greek ... and limited himself to reproducing it in a mechanical way exactly as he managed to decipher it". A few years later an "anonymous corrector" with good knowledge of Greek rectified "many errors or readings that, rightly or wrongly, he considered erroneous" (Dorandi 2013, p. 21).) Manuscript P (Paris) is dated to the 11th/12th century, and is in the Bibliothèque nationale de France. Manuscript F (Florence) is dated to the 13th century, and is in the Laurentian Library. The titles for the individual biographies used in modern editions are absent from these earliest manuscripts, however they can be found inserted into the blank spaces and margins of manuscript P by a later hand.

There seem to have been some early Latin translations, but they no longer survive. A 10th-century work entitled Tractatus de dictis philosophorum shows some knowledge of Diogenes. Henry Aristippus, in the 12th century, is known to have translated at least some of the work into Latin, and in the 14th century an unknown author made use of a Latin translation for his De vita et moribus philosophorum (attributed erroneously to Walter Burley).

==== Printed editions ====
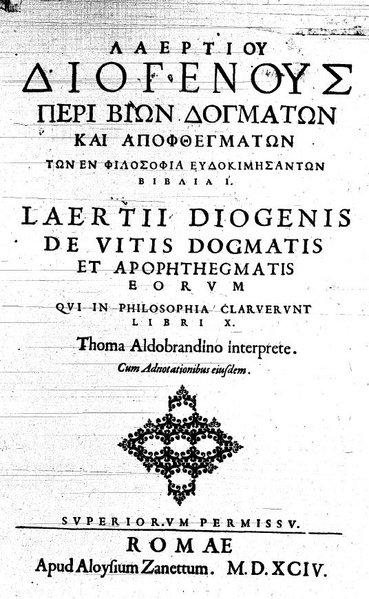
Title page of an edition in Greek and Latin, 1594

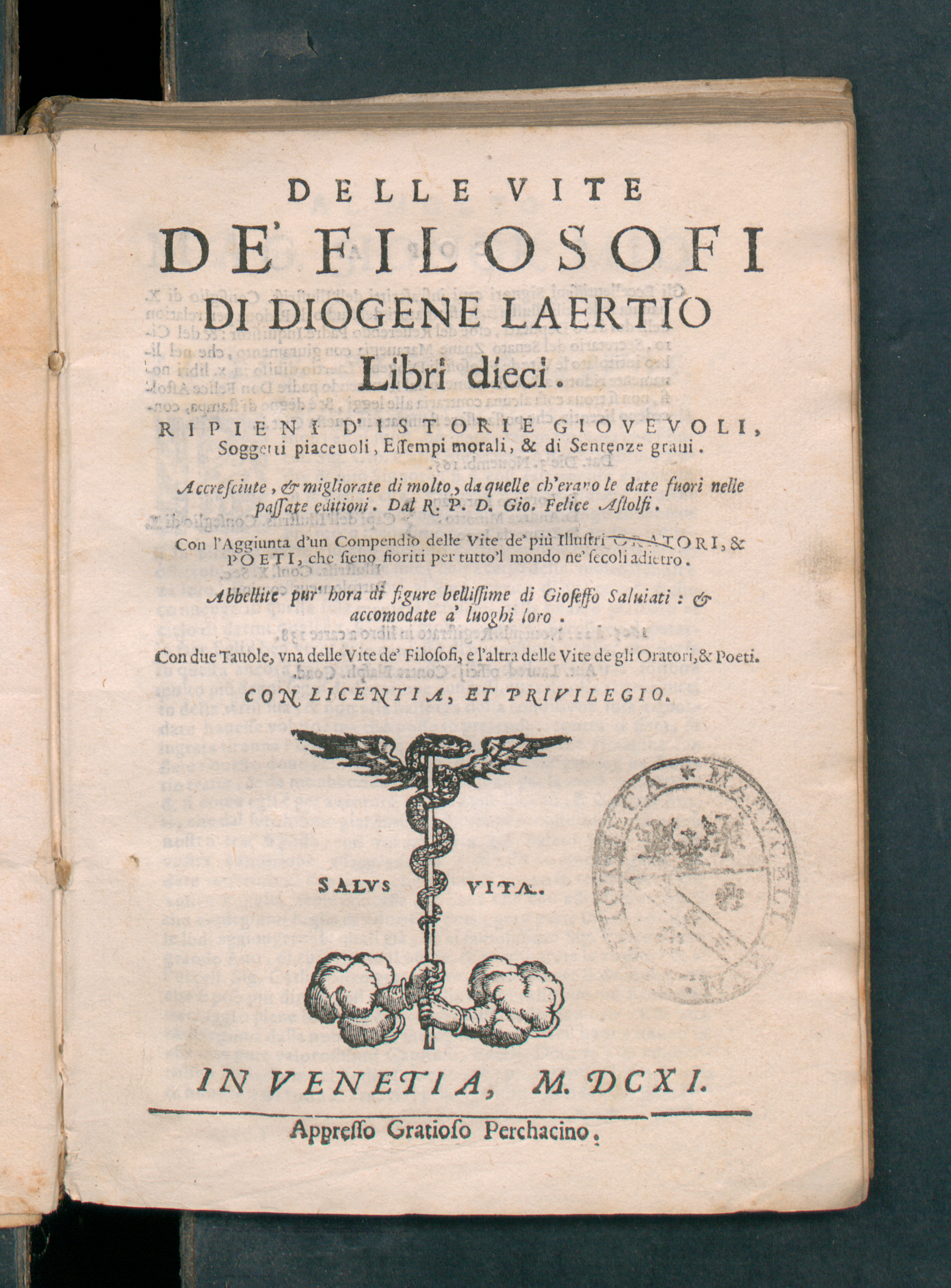
1611 Italian edition

The first printed editions were Latin translations. The first, Laertii Diogenis Vitae et sententiae eorum qui in philosophia probati fuerunt (Romae: Giorgo Lauer, 1472), printed the translation of Ambrogio Traversari (whose manuscript presentation copy to Cosimo de' Medici was dated February 8, 1433) and was edited by Elio Francesco Marchese. The Greek text of the lives of Aristotle and Theophrastus appeared in the third volume of the Aldine Aristotle in 1497. The first edition of the whole Greek text was that published by Hieronymus Froben in 1533. The first Greek/Latin edition was by Henri Estienne in 1570. The Greek/Latin edition of 1692 by Marcus Meibomius divided each of the ten books into paragraphs of equal length, and progressively numbered them, providing the system still in use today.

The first critical edition of the entire text, by H. S. Long in the Oxford Classical Texts, was not produced until 1964; this edition was superseded by Miroslav Marcovich's Teubner edition, published between 1999 and 2002. A new edition, by Tiziano Dorandi, was published by Cambridge University Press in 2013.

==== English translations ====
Thomas Stanley's 1656 History of Philosophy adapts the format and content of Laertius's work into English, but Stanley compiled his book from a number of classical biographies of philosophers. The first complete English translation was a late 17th-century translation by ten different persons. A better translation was made by Charles Duke Yonge (1853), but although this was more literal, it still contained many inaccuracies. The next translation was by Robert Drew Hicks (1925) for the Loeb Classical Library, although it is slightly bowdlerized. A new translation by Pamela Mensch was published by Oxford University Press in 2018. Another by Stephen White was published by Cambridge University Press in 2020.

== Legacy and assessment ==
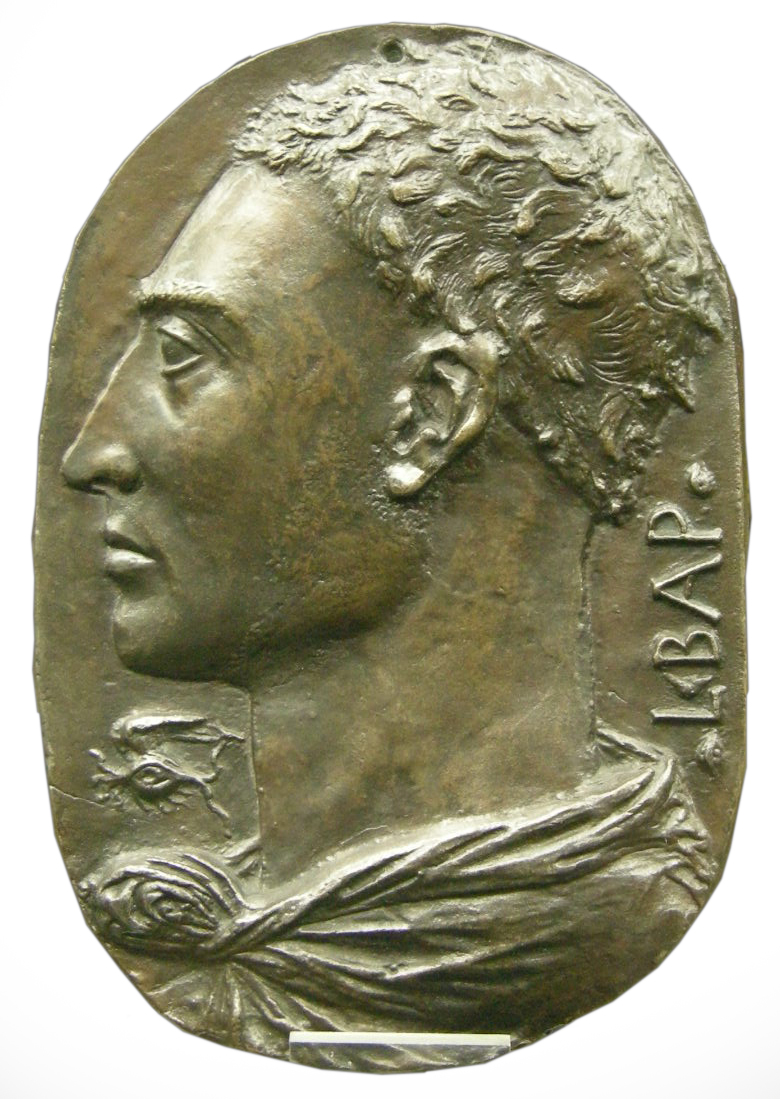
The Italian Renaissance scholar, painter, philosopher, and architect Leon Battista Alberti (1404–1472) modeled his own autobiography on Diogenes Laërtius's Life of Thales.

Henricus Aristippus, the archdeacon of Catania, produced a Latin translation of Diogenes Laërtius's book in southern Italy in the late 1150s, which has since been lost or destroyed. Geremia da Montagnone used this translation as a source for his Compedium moralium notabilium (c. 1310) and an anonymous Italian author used it as a source for work entitled Liber de vita et moribus philosophorum (written c. 1317–1320), which reached international popularity in the Late Middle Ages. The monk Ambrogio Traversari (1386–1439) produced another Latin translation in Florence between 1424 and 1433, for which far better records have survived. The Italian Renaissance scholar, painter, philosopher, and architect Leon Battista Alberti (1404–1472) borrowed from Traversari's translation of the Lives and Opinions of Eminent Philosophers in Book 2 of his Libri della famiglia and modeled his own autobiography on Diogenes Laërtius's Life of Thales.

Diogenes Laërtius's work has had a complicated reception in modern times. The value of his Lives and Opinions of Eminent Philosophers as an insight into the private lives of the Greek sages led the French Renaissance philosopher Michel de Montaigne (1533–1592) to exclaim that he wished that, instead of one Laërtius, there had been a dozen. Georg Wilhelm Friedrich Hegel (1770–1831) criticized Diogenes Laërtius for his lack of philosophical talent and categorized his work as nothing more than a compilation of previous writers' opinions. Nonetheless, he admitted that Diogenes Laërtius's compilation was an important one given the information that it contained. Hermann Usener (1834–1905) deplored Diogenes Laërtius as a "complete ass" (asinus germanus) in his Epicurea (1887). Werner Jaeger (1888–1961) damned him as "that great ignoramus". In the late twentieth and early twenty-first centuries, however, scholars have managed to partially redeem Diogenes Laertius's reputation as a writer by reading his book in a Hellenistic literary context.

Nonetheless, modern scholars treat Diogenes's testimonia with caution, especially when he fails to cite his sources. Herbert S. Long warns: "Diogenes has acquired an importance out of all proportion to his merits because the loss of many primary sources and of the earlier secondary compilations has accidentally left him the chief continuous source for the history of Greek philosophy." Robert M. Strozier offers a somewhat more positive assessment of Diogenes Laertius's reliability, noting that many other ancient writers attempt to reinterpret and expand on the philosophical teachings they describe, something which Diogenes Laërtius rarely does. Strozier concludes, "Diogenes Laertius is, when he does not conflate hundreds of years of distinctions, reliable simply because he is a less competent thinker than those on whom he writes, is less liable to re-formulate statements and arguments, and especially in the case of Epicurus, less liable to interfere with the texts he quotes. He does, however, simplify."

Despite his importance to the history of western philosophy and the controversy surrounding him, according to Gian Mario Cao, Diogenes Laërtius has still not received adequate philological attention. Both modern critical editions of his book, by H. S. Long (1964) and by M. Marcovich (1999) have received extensive criticism from scholars.

He is criticized primarily for being overly concerned with superficial details of the philosophers' lives and lacking the intellectual capacity to explore their actual philosophical works with any penetration. However, according to statements of the 14th-century monk Walter Burley in his De vita et moribus philosophorum, the text of Diogenes seems to have been much fuller than that which we now possess.

=== Reliability ===
Although Diogenes had a will to objectivity and fact-checking, Diogenes's works are today seen as generally unreliable from a historical perspective. He is neither consistent nor reliable in some of his reports and some of the details he cites contain obvious errors. Some of them were probably introduced by copyists in the transmission of the text from antiquity, but some errors are undoubtedly due to Diogenes himself. The reliability of Diogenes's sources have also been questioned, since he uses comic poets as sources. Professor Brian Gregor suggests that readers will benefit from modern scholarly assistance while reading Diogenes's biographies, since they are "notoriously unreliable". Some scholars (e.g. Delfim Leão) state that Diogenes's unreliability is not entirely his responsibility and blame his sources instead.

== Editions and translations ==
- Diogenis Laertii Vitae philosophorum edidit Miroslav Marcovich, Stuttgart-Lipsia, Teubner, 1999–2002. Bibliotheca scriptorum Graecorum et Romanorum Teubneriana, vol. 1: Books I–X ISBN 9783598713163; vol. 2: Excerpta Byzantina; v. 3: Indices by Hans Gärtner.
- Lives of Eminent Philosophers, edited by Tiziano Dorandi, Cambridge: Cambridge University Press, 2013 (Cambridge Classical Texts and Commentaries, vol. 50, new radically improved critical edition).
- Laërtius, Diogenes (1688). The lives, opinions, and remarkable sayings of the most famous ancient philosophers. The first volume written in Greek, by Diogenes Laertius; made English by several hands. Vol. 1. Translated by Fetherstone, T.; White, Sam.; Smith, E.; Philips, J.; Kippax, R.; Baxter, William; M., R. (2 volumes ed.). London: Edward Brewster.
- Laërtius, Diogenes (1853). Lives and Opinions of Eminent Philosophers. Translated by Yonge, Charles Duke. London: G.H. Bohn.
- Translation by R.D. Hicks:
  - "Index" . Lives of the Eminent Philosophers (Two volume ed.). Loeb Classical Library.
  - Lives of Eminent Philosophers. Vol. I. Harvard University Press, Loeb Classical Library. 1925. ISBN 978-0-674-99203-0.
  - Lives of Eminent Philosophers. Vol. II. Harvard University Press, Loeb Classical Library. 1925. ISBN 978-0-674-99204-7.
- Translations based on the critical edition by Tiziano Dorandi:
  - Lives of Eminent Philosophers. Translated by Pamela Mensch. Oxford University Press. 2018. ISBN 978-0-19-086217-6.
  - White, Stephen (2020). Lives of Eminent Philosophers. Cambridge University Press. ISBN 978-0-521-88335-1.
