= Arellia gens =

Ancient Roman family

The gens Arellia was a plebeian family at Rome. Although of equestrian rank, this gens does not appear to have been particularly large or important, and is known primarily from three individuals.

== Members ==
- Arellius, a talented painter at Rome in the latter part of the first century BC, who gained notoriety for depicted goddesses with the features of his own mistresses.
- Arellius Fuscus, a rhetorician in Greek and Latin at Rome, around the beginning of the first century. He was a tutor of Ovid and Fabianus, and a rival of Marcus Porcius Latro. His son, who had the same name, was also a rhetorician.
- Quintus Arellius Fuscus, either the father or the son, bore the praenomen Quintus, but it is not certain which.

== See also ==
- List of Roman gentes

== Bibliography ==
- Lucius Annaeus Seneca (Seneca the Elder), Controversiae (Controversies), Suasoriae (Rhetorical Exercises).
- Gaius Plinius Secundus (Pliny the Elder), Historia Naturalis (Natural History).
- Dictionary of Greek and Roman Biography and Mythology, William Smith, ed., Little, Brown and Company, Boston (1849).
