= De vita et moribus philosophorum =

Fourteenth century Latin biographical dictionary

- Lives and Manners of the Philosophers
- First page of the De vita from a 15th-century illuminated manuscript from Milan
- Author(s): Anonymous
- Ascribed to: Pseudo-Walter Burley
- Language: Latin
- Date: 1317–1320
- Subject: Biographical dictionary

De vita et moribus philosophorum ('Lives and Manners of the Philosophers') is an anonymous Latin biographical dictionary compiled in northern Italy in the early fourteenth century, probably between 1317 and 1320. It presents accounts of 132 figures from Greek and Roman antiquity, ranging from Thales of Miletus in the sixth century BC to Priscian in the sixth century AD, and includes philosophers alongside poets, historians, physicians, grammarians, and statesmen.

The text circulated widely in manuscript and print. There are over 270 manuscript copies of De vita et moribus philosophorum, mostly from France and Italy. It was a popular early printed book, going through 30 editions by 1530. It was translated into Spanish in the early fifteenth century and into Italian by 1475. Two German translations had been made by 1490, and three in Polish by the early sixteenth century. It was also translated into Catalan, French and Czech.

Although it was attributed from the fifteenth century onward to the English philosopher Walter Burley, modern scholarship has rejected this attribution and treats the work as anonymous. The unidentified Italian compiler is conventionally referred to as Pseudo-Walter Burley.

== Authorship ==
The work was formerly attributed to the English philosopher Walter Burley and dated to the 1340s, after he had spent time in southern Europe. Burley's name is associated with the text in manuscript ascriptions from the fifteenth century, although how the attribution arose is unclear. Hermann Knust and John O. H. Stigall hypothesised that Burley produced the work to instruct Edward, Prince of Wales, while other scholars hypothesised that it was intended for his students as a convenient introductory text to philosophers.

This attribution was rebutted in 1990 by Mario Grignsachi who showed that the work was composed in Northern Italy and that it was in circulation by the 1320s, prior to Burley's arrival in the region. The anonymous Italian compiler is now often referred to as "Pseudo-Burley".

== Contents ==
The work is a compilation of biographies written in Latin. It covers ancient Greek and Roman figures and extends into later antiquity, with lives of philosophers alongside poets, historians, orators, statesmen, physicians, and grammarians. In its usual form it contains accounts of 132 subjects, from Thales of Miletus in the 6th century BC to Priscian in the 6th century AD.

Entries vary sharply in length, from a few words to several pages. Aristarchus received an eight-word biography, "Aristarchus, a grammarian, flourished in the time of the Maccabees", while Socrates received five and a half folios, Diogenes four and a half, and Plato four.

Where possible the compiler supplies dates. Greek figures are commonly dated by reference to Hebrew kings or prophets, and Roman figures by reference to other Romans. Many entries identify the subject's writings, and the work uses anecdotes to illustrate the character of the subject, often presented in the form of questions to and answers from them. Entries typically combine biographical detail with material presenting the subject's moral qualities or personal traits.

The compilation draws on earlier works. It relies on Diogenes Laertius' Lives and Opinions of Eminent Philosophers, translated from Greek into Latin by Henricus Aristippus, and also draws on Bocados de oro, an Arabic-Spanish-Latin text. It is also likely that the compiler used Speculum Maius by Vincent of Beauvais and Compendiloquium by John of Wales.

=== Subjects ===
Listed below are the subjects of Pseudo-Walter Burley's biographies.

- 1. Thales of Miletus
- 2. Solon
- 3. Chilo
- 4. Pittacus
- 5. Bias
- 6. Cleobolus
- 7. Periander
- 8. Zoroaster
- 9. Anaximander
- 10. Anacharsis
- 11. Misosternon
- 12. Epimenides
- 13. Ferecides
- 14. Homer
- 15. Lygurgus
- 16. Anaximenes of Miletus
- 17. Pythagoras
- 18. Anaxagoras
- 19. Crates
- 20. Stilbon
- 21. Archilogus
- 22. Simonides
- 23. Archita
- 24. Aesop
- 25. Zenon
- 26. Gorgias
- 27. Isocrates
- 28. Protagoras
- 29. Crisippus
- 30. Socrates
- 31. Aristippus
- 32. Xenophon
- 33. Antistenes
- 34. Alchibiades
- 35. Eschines
- 36. Euripides
- 37. Demosthenes
- 38. Sophocles
- 39. Pericles
- 40. Themistocles
- 41. Aristides
- 42. Eudoxus
- 43. Aratus
- 44. Democritus
- 45. Hippocrates
- 46. Euripides
- 47. Heraclitus
- 48. Empedocles
- 49. Parmenides
- 50. Diogenes
- 51. Carneides
- 52. Plato
- 53. Aristotle
- 54. Xenophilus
- 55. Phaedo
- 56. Aeschylus
- 57. Speusippus
- 58. Apuleius
- 59. Plotinus
- 60. Hermes Trismegistus
- 61. Xenocrates
- 62. Demas
- 63. Anaxiamenes
- 64. Epicurus
- 65. Polystratus and Ipoclides
- 66. Callisthenes
- 67. Anaxarchus
- 68. Theophrastus
- 69. Diodorus
- 70. Polemo
- 71. Antipater
- 72. Archephilas
- 73. Erasistratus
- 74. Archimenides
- 75. Ptolomeus
- 76. Menander
- 77. Philemon
- 78. Senon (Note: A misreading of a difficult passage in Valerius Maximus led Pseudo-Burley to create a second stoic named Zeno. See Jill Kraye, "From Medieval to Early Modern Stoicism", in Charles Burnett, José Meirinhos and Jacqueline Hamesse, eds., Continuities and Disruptions between the Middle Ages and the Renaissance (Brepols, 2008), p. 5.)
- 79. Senon
- 80. Egesias
- 81. Ennius
- 82. Aristarchus of Samothrace
- 83. Pancupius
- 84. Stacius
- 85. Valerius Catullus
- 86. Plocius
- 87. Panaetius
- 88. Livy
- 89. Posidonius
- 90. Ecaten
- 91. Marcus
- 92. Diodorus
- 93. Curio
- 94. Scipio
- 95. Cicero
- 96. Cato
- 97. Diogenes
- 98. Antipater
- 99. Sallust
- 100. Plaucius
- 101. Vitus Lucretius
- 102. Lucius
- 103. Plaucius
- 104. Virgil
- 105. Iulius
- 106. Accius Lucius
- 107. Terence
- 108. Varro
- 109. Gallus
- 110. Horace
- 111. Xistus
- 112. Marcus Nerius
- 113. Athenodorus
- 114. Ovid
- 115. Valerius
- 116. Calciterus
- 117. Seneca
- 118. Quintilian
- 119. Plutarch
- 120. Plinius
- 121. Ptolomeus
- 122. Secundus
- 123. Apolonius
- 124. Basilides
- 125. Taurus
- 126. Galienus
- 127. Trogus
- 128. Porphyry of Tyre
- 129. Claudius
- 130. Simachus
- 131. Priscian

== Manuscripts and publication history ==
Page from an incunabulum of De vita printed by Anton Koberger at Nuremberg about 1473

=== Manuscripts ===
The text circulated widely in manuscript. In 2017, Rita Copeland gave a figure of over 270 extant manuscripts, as well as evidence for additional copies that no longer survive. The surviving manuscripts are mainly continental, with few English copies.

The text is not uniform across the manuscript tradition. While the standard form contains biographies of 132 individuals, many manuscripts transmit shorter versions, and abridgement is common. About a quarter of the extant manuscripts fall within a single redaction.

Manuscripts also differ in presentation and apparent use. Marston MS. 80, copied around 1410, appears in a collection of Italian moralising texts and seems to have functioned as a schoolbook. Marston MS. 91, copied in the fifteenth century, contains only 76 biographies and includes a portrait of Burley. London, BL, Add. 24662 includes notes from readers, while London, BL, Arundel 397 has Aristotle's works written as a list, which Copeland argues was intended as a "quick and useful reference". Other copies were produced as luxury manuscripts.

=== Publication history ===
The text entered print early and was frequently reissued. By 1530 it had appeared in thirty editions. It was translated into Spanish in the early fifteenth century and into Italian by 1475. Two German translations, one by Hans Lobenzweig and another by Anton Sorg, had appeared by 1490. Three Polish translations were made by the early sixteenth century. It was also translated into Catalan, French and Czech.

Other editions were published under other titles and attributions, sometimes through misunderstanding and sometimes deliberately. An Italian language edition published in Venice in 1535 titled the work "Moral Philosophers and Their Memorable Sayings Taken from Laertius and Other Ancient Authors", mistaking the compilation for direct ancient biography. In 1603 the Italian lawyer Anastasius a Sala attempted to present it as his own work.

Modern editorial work began with Knust's 1886 edition, which printed the Latin text alongside a fifteenth-century Spanish translation. An unpublished 1956 doctoral dissertation by Stigall collated six fourteenth-century manuscripts, while in 1969 Rainer Wedler produced a German edition.

== Editions ==
- Stigall, John Oliver H., ed. The 'De vita et moribus philosophorum' of Walter Burley: An Edition with Introduction. PhD diss. University of Colorado at Boulder, 1956. ProQuest 0022637
- Crosas López, Francisco, ed. Vida y costumbres de los viejos filósofos : la traducción castellana cuatrocentista del De vita et moribus philosophorum atribuido a Walter Burley. Iberoamericana Editorial Vervuert, 2002.

== Bibliography ==
- Copeland, Rita. (2016) "Behind the Lives of Philosophers: Reading Diogenes Laertius in the Western Middle Ages." Interfaces: A Journal of Medieval European Literatures 3: 245–263.
- Crosas López, Francisco. (2000) "Traducción castellana medieval del De vita et moribus philosophorum de Walter Burley." Rilce: Revista de Filología Hispánica 16(1): 38–45.
- Ferrer Santanach, Montserrat. (2011) "Diogenes Laertius's Lives in the Fifteenth-Century Italian and Catalan Versions of Pseudo-Burley's Vita et moribus." Studi medievali 52(Fasc. 2): 681–695.
- Grignaschi, Mario. (1990) "Lo pseudo Walter Burley e il Liber de vita et moribus philosophorum." Medioevo 16: 131–190.
- Lutz, Cora E. (1972) "Walter Burley's De vita et moribus philosophorum." The Yale University Library Gazette 46(4): 247–252. JSTOR 40858433
- Matthews, Alastair. (2010) "Literary Lives in Medieval Germany: The Wartburg Song Contest in Three Hagiographical Narratives." Deutsche Vierteljahrsschrift für Literaturwissenschaft und Geistesgeschichte 84(1): 44–59. doi:10.1007/bf03375700
- Surdich, Francesco (1982). "Colonna, Giovanni." Dizionario Biografico degli Italiani, Vol. 27. Istituto dell'Enciclopedia Italiana.
