= Mnasagoras =

Ancient Greek stoic philosopher

Mnasagoras (Greek: Μνασαγόρας; fl. 2nd century BC) was an ancient Greek stoic philosopher. He was probably from Alexandria Troas.

Almost nothing is known about the life of Mnasagoras. He was either the disciple of Antipater of Tarsos or Diogenes of Babylon (or both). The book VII of Diogenes Laërtius' work Lives and Opinions of Eminent Philosophers has contained his biography, but the section containing it has been lost; only a reference to it in the table of contents remains.
