= Alexamenus of Teos =

Ancient Greek writer

Alexamenus of Teos (Ancient Greek: Τήιος Ἀλεξαμενός, 5th century BC?) was one of the potential inventors of Greek literary genre of prose dialogue. Also known as Alexamenus of Tenos or Alexamenus of Styra, the only surviving news about him have been handed down, centuries later, by three sources: Athenaeus of Naucratis, Diogenes Laërtius and a papyrus from Oxyrhynchus.

Atheneus (XI 550c) reports the dual testimony of Nicias of Nicaea and Sotion, according to which Aristotle, in the lost work On the Poets (Περὶ ποιητῶν), gave Alexamenus chronological priority in the invention of dialogue:

Ἐγκώμια αὐτοῦ (sc. τοῦ Μένωνος) διεξέρχεται ὁ τοὺς ἄλλους ἁπαξαπλῶς κακολογήσας (sc. Πλάτων), ἐν μὲν τῇ πολιτείᾳ Ὅμηρον ἐκβάλλων καὶ τὴν μιμητικὴν ποίησιν, αὐτὸς δὲ τοὺς διαλόγους μιμητικῶς γράψας, ὧν τῆς ἰδέας οὐδ' αὐτὸς εὑρετὴς ἐστι. πρὸ γὰρ αὐτοῦ τοῦθ' εὗρε τὸ εἶδος τῶν λόγων ὁ Τήιος Ἀλεξαμενός, ὡς Νικίας ὁ Νικαεὺς ἱστορεῖ καὶ Σωτίων. Ἀριστοτέλης δὲ ἐν τῷ περὶ ποιητῶν οὕτως γράφει, " οὐκοῦν οὐδὲ ἐμμέτρους τοὺς καλουμένους Σώφρονος μίμους μὴ φῶμεν εἶναι λόγους καὶ μιμήσεις, ἢ τοὺς Ἀλεξαμενοῦ τοῦ Τήιου τοὺς πρώτους [or: προτέρους/πρότερον] γραφέντας τῶν Σωξρατικῶν διαλόγων; " ἀντικρὺς φάσκων ὁ πολυμαθέστατος Ἀριστοτέλης πρὸ Πλάτωνος διαλόγους γεγραφέναι τὸν Ἀλεξαμενόν.

«And his encomium (sc. of Menon) is uttered by him who despised others on the whole (sc. Plato), by banishing Homer and imitative poetry in the Republic, even though he himself had written dialogues in mimetic form, of whose form he is not even the inventor. In fact before him Alexamenus of Teos invented this kind of speeches, as witnessed by Nicias of Nicaea and Sotion. Aristotle then, in his work On the Poets, writes thus: “Then, do we not say that the so-called mimes of Sophron, written in verse, are speeches and imitations, or that those [the writings?] of Alexamenus of Teos, written first among [or: before] the Socratic dialogues, are so?”, thus asserting, that great sage Aristotle, that some dialogues were composed before Plato».

It is unclear whether the priority refers to Socratic dialogues or to dialogue in general. Some scholars accept this testimony in the form preserved by manuscripts, according to which Alexamenus wrote the first (πρώτους) among the Socratic dialogues. Others propose to correct πρώτους to προτέρους or πρότερον, altering the meaning: Alexamenus would not be the inventor of the Socratic dialogues, but a precursor.

Aristotelian opinion is critically witnessed by Diogenes Laërtius (III 48), who also finds mention of it in Favorinus:

Διαλόγους τοίνυν φασὶ πρῶτον γράψαι Ζήνωνα τὸν Ἐλεάτην· Ἀριστοτέλης δὲ ἐν πρώτῳ Περὶ ποιητῶν Ἀλεξαμενὸν Στυρέα ἢ Τήιον, ὡς καὶ Φαβωρῖνος ἐν Ἀπομνημονεύμασι. δοκεῖ δέ μοι Πλάτων ἀκριβώσας τὸ εἶδος καὶ τὰ πρωτεῖα δικαίως ἂν ὥσπερ τοῦ κάλλους οὕτω καὶ τῆς εὑρέσεως ἀποφέρεσθαι.

«So they say that the first to write dialogues was the Eleatic Zeno; but Aristotle, in the first book of On the Poets, [says that he was] Alexamenus of Styra or Teos, as Favorinus also [says] in the Memoirs. But it seems to me that Plato, having perfected the literary genre, would rightly hold the primacy, as of beauty, so also of invention».

The writer of the papyrus of Oxyrhynchus (P. Oxy. 45 3219), which probably contains a treatise on Plato and the dialogue, confirms the news, but takes an anti-Aristotelian position and states that the main influence on Plato comes from the Sicilian mimographer Sophron:

ἐ]ν τούτῳ κ[αὶ C]ώφρον[α] μειμηcάμε-

νοc τὸν μιμογράφον κα<τὰ> τὸ δραμα-

τικὸν τῶν διαλόγων· οὐ γὰρ πειc-

τ[έ]ον Ἀριcτοτέλει ὑπὸ τῆc πρὸc Πλά-

τωνα βαcκανίας ε[ἰ]πόντι ἐν τῷ

πρώτῳ Περὶ ποιητικῆς καὶ πρὸ

Πλάτωνοc γεγράφθαι δραματικοὺc

διαλό]γ[ους ὑ]π' [Ἀ]λεξαμενοῦ Τηνίου

«...in this also imitating Sophron, the writer of mimes, for the dramatic quality of the dialogues. For one should not believe Aristotle, who, out of jealous spite towards Plato, says in the first book of On poetry [= On the Poets] that even before Plato dramatic dialogues had been written by Alexamenos of Tenos»

Aristotle's view is therefore differently evaluated. However, if we believe his testimony, it seems that the literature of Alexamenos, whatever attributes it had, is comparable to the mimes of Sophron, of which little survived anyway. The basic question is: should we assume that Alexamenus was the first Socratic to have composed in a new literary genre, or that he was an earlier dialogue writer and uncoupled from Socratics and Socratic literature?

== See also ==
- Sophron – Ancient Greek writer (fl. 430 BCE)
