= Sophron =

Ancient Greek writer (fl. 430 BCE)

Sophron of Syracuse (Ancient Greek: Σώφρων ὁ Συρακούσιος, fl. 430 BC), Magna Graecia, was a writer of mimes (μῖμος, a kind of prose drama).

Sophron was the author of prose dialogues in the Doric dialect, containing both male and female characters, some serious, others humorous in style, and depicting scenes from the daily life of the Sicilian Greeks. Although in prose, they were regarded as poems; in any case they were not intended for stage representation. They were written in pithy and popular language, full of proverbs and colloquialisms.

== Influence ==
Plato is said to have introduced Sophron's works into Athens and to have made use of them in his dialogues; according to Diogenes Laërtius, they were Plato's constant companions, and he even slept with them under his pillow; the Suda says of the mimes of Sophron, "Plato the philosopher always read them, so as to be sent into an occasional doze." Some idea of their general character may be gathered from the 2nd and 15th idylls of Theocritus, which are said to have been imitated from the Akestriai and Isthmiazousai of his Syracusan predecessor. Their influence is also to be traced in the satires of Persius.

Are we then to deny that the so-called mimes of Sophron, which are not even in metre, are stories and imitations, or the dialogues of Alexamenos of Teos, which were written before the Socratic dialogues? Plato is said to have been an admirer and imitator of Sophron, whose works were found under his pillow.

— Humphry House

== Editions ==
The fragments of Sophron are collected in:

- Ahrens, H. L., De graecae linguae dialectis (1843), ii. (app.), and C. J. Botzon (1867); see also his De Sophrone et Xenarcho mimographis (1856).

The most recent edition is:

- Hordern, J. H., Sophron's Mimes: Text, Translation, and Commentary, Oxford, 2004. ISBN 9780199266135.
