= Crinis =

Ancient Greek Stoic philosopher

- Κρὶνις
- Born: c. 2nd century BC
- Died: c. 1st century BC
- Cause of death: Fright

Philosophical work
- Era: Hellenistic philosophy
- School: Stoicism
- Language: Ancient Greek
- Main interests: Logic

Crinis (Greek: Κρὶνις) was a Stoic philosopher who lived in the 2nd and 1st centuries BC, who was contemporary with and likely a pupil of Archedemus of Tarsus. He seems to have founded an independent school within the boundaries of the Stoic system, since the authority of his followers (οἱ περὶ Κρίνιν) is sometimes quoted. He is mentioned also by Arrian.

According to Diogenes Laërtius, Crinias was interested in Logic, and wrote a book called Dialectic Art, (Ancient Greek: διαλεκτικὴ τέχνη), from which Diogenes quotes:

An argument, as Crinis says, is that which is composed of a lemma or major premise, an assumption or minor premise, and a conclusion; as for instance this,

"If it is day, it is light;"
"But it is day, therefore it is light."
For the lemma, or major premise, is, "If it is day, it is light."
The assumption, or minor premise, is, "It is day."
The conclusion follows, "Therefore it is light."

The Discourses of Epictetus mentions his connection to Archedemus and suggests that he died from fright:

Go away now and read Archedemus; then if a mouse should leap down and make a noise, you are a dead man. For such a death awaits you as it did - what was the man's name? - Crinis; and he too was proud, because he understood Archedemus.

The Suda speaks of a Crinis who was a priest of Apollo, and may be the same as the one mentioned in a scholion.
