= Dardanus of Athens =

Ancient Greek philosopher

Dardanus (/ˈdɑːrdənəs/; Greek: Δάρδανος, Dardanos) was a Stoic philosopher, who lived c. 160 – c. 85 BC.

He was a pupil of Diogenes of Babylon and Antipater of Tarsus. Cicero mentions him as being one of the leaders of the Stoic school (Latin: principes Stoicorum) at Athens together with Mnesarchus at a time when Antiochus of Ascalon was turning away from scepticism (c. 95 BC). After the death of Panaetius (109 BC), the Stoic school at Athens seems to have fragmented, and Dardanus was probably one of several leading Stoics teaching in this era.

Nothing else is known about his life, and he was presumably dead by the time Cicero was learning philosophy in Athens in 79 BC.
