= Sosigenes =

Sosigenes may refer to:

== People ==
- Sosigenes (astronomer), the astronomer consulted by Julius Caesar for the design of the Julian calendar
- Sosigenes the Peripatetic, a philosopher living at the end of the 2nd century and tutor of Alexander of Aphrodisias
- Sosigenes (Stoic), an ancient Greek philosopher

== Other uses ==
- Sosigenes (crater), on the Moon
