= Sotion =

2nd-century BC Greek writer

Sotion of Alexandria (Ancient Greek: Σωτίων, gen.: Σωτίωνος; fl. c. 200 – 170 BC) was a Greek doxographer and biographer, and an important source for Diogenes Laërtius. None of his works survive; they are known only indirectly. His principal work, the Διαδοχή or Διαδοχαί (the Successions), was one of the first history books to have organized philosophers into schools of successive influence: e.g., the so-called Ionian School of Thales, Anaximander and Anaximenes. It is quoted very frequently by Diogenes Laërtius, and Athenaeus. Sotion's Successions likely consisted of 23 books, and at least partly drew on the doxography of Theophrastus. The Successions was influential enough to be abridged by Heraclides Lembus in the mid-2nd century BC, and works by the same title were subsequently written by Sosicrates of Rhodes and Antisthenes of Rhodes.

He was also, apparently, the author of a work, On Timon's Silloi, and of a work entitled Refutations of Diocles.
