= Nestor of Tarsus =

Ancient Greek Stoic philosopher

Nestor of Tarsus (Ancient Greek: Νέστωρ) was an ancient Greek philosopher of the Stoic school of thought. He was from Tarsus in Cilikia.

Nestor was active at a Stoic school in Athens. Otherwise, little is known about his life. The Lives and Opinions of Eminent Philosophers by Diogenes Laertius contained his biography in Book VII, but that portion of a book has disappeared; only the mention of his name in the table of contents remains. Nestor was a contemporary of Panaetius, either his disciple or a fellow student. He is sometimes mixed with another Nestor of Tarsos, who is said to have been a teacher of Tiberius, but the latter lived in the first century AD, making him not a contemporary.
