= Alexamenus =

Alexamenus or Alexamenos may refer to:

- Alexamenus of Aetolia, Aetolian general in 196 BC
- Alexamenus of Teos (5th century BC?), potential inventor of Greek literary genre of prose dialogue

== See also ==
- Alexamenos graffito, a Roman graffito from around 200 AD, often called the earliest depiction of Jesus
