= Plotius =

Plotius may refer to:

- Plotius, synonym for the spider genus Euryattus
- Plotius, alternative spelling of Plautius, nomen of the Plautia gens, a Roman family
  - Lucius Plotius Gallus (1st century BC), Roman rhetorician
  - Plotius Tucca (1st century BC), Roman poet
  - Plotius Firmus (1st century AD), Roman senator
  - Plotius Pegasus (1st century AD), Roman senator
  - Plotius Grypus, suffect consul in AD 88
  - Marius Plotius Sacerdos (3rd century AD), Roman grammarian
