= Doxography =

Literary genre

Doxography (Greek: δόξα – "an opinion", "a point of view" + γράφειν – "to write", "to describe") is a term used especially for the works of classical historians, describing the points of view of past philosophers and scientists. The term was coined by the German classical scholar Hermann Alexander Diels.

== In Ancient Greek philosophy ==
A great many philosophical works have been lost; our limited knowledge of such lost works comes chiefly through the doxographical works of later philosophers, commentators, and biographers. The Stanford Encyclopedia of Philosophy lists the following works as being representative doxographies:

- Cicero - Academica, De Finibus, De Natura Deorum, De Fato, De Officiis
- Aetius - Vetusta Placita
- Clement of Alexandria - Stromata
- Diogenes Laertius - Lives and Opinions of Eminent Philosophers
- Hippolytus of Rome - Refutation of All Heresies

Philosophers such as Plato and Aristotle also act as doxographers, as their comments on the ideas of their predecessors indirectly tell us what their predecessors' beliefs were. Plato's Defense of Socrates, for example, tells us much of what we know about the natural philosophy of Anaxagoras.

=== Successions of Philosophers ===
Successions of Philosophers were works whose purpose was to depict the philosophers of different schools in terms of a line of succession of which they were a part. From the 3rd to the 1st centuries BC there were Successions (Greek: Διαδοχαί) written by Antigonus of Carystus, Sotion, Heraclides Lembos (an epitome of Sotion), Sosicrates, Alexander Polyhistor, Jason of Nysa, Antisthenes of Rhodes, and Nicias of Nicaea. The surviving Lives and Opinions of Eminent Philosophers by Diogenes Laërtius (3rd century AD) draws upon this tradition.

In addition to these, there were often histories of single schools. Such works were created by Phaenias of Eresus (On the Socratics), Idomeneus of Lampsacus (On the Socratics), Sphaerus (On the Eretrian Philosophers), and Straticles (On Stoics). Among the papyri found at the Villa of the Papyri at Herculaneum, there are works devoted to the successions of the Stoics, Academics, and Epicureans. In a later period, Plutarch produced On the First Philosophers and their Successors and On the Cyrenaics, and Galen wrote On Plato's Sect and On the Hedonistic Sect (Epicureans). There were often biographies of individual philosophers with a brief description of his successors. Of such nature were Aristoxenus's Life of Pythagoras, Andronicus's Life of Aristotle, Ptolemy's Life of Aristotle, and Iamblichus's Life of Pythagoras.

== In other traditions ==
=== Persian doxography ===
The Persian Dabestan-e Mazaheb discusses numerous philosophies including several in Persia and India. Its author appears to belong to a Persian Sipásíán tradition which differs somewhat from orthodox Zoroastrianism. Its authorship is disputed. Some scholars have suggested that Kay-Khosrow Esfandiyar, the son of Azar Kayvan may have written it.

=== Jain doxography ===
Haribhadra (8th century CE) was one of the leading proponents of anekāntavāda. He was the first classical author to write a doxography, a compendium of a variety of intellectual views. This attempted to contextualise Jain thoughts within the broad framework. It interacted with the many possible intellectual orientations available to Indian thinkers around the 8th century.

=== Islamic doxography ===
Islamic doxography is an aggregate of theosophical works (like Kitab al-Maqalat by Abu Mansur Al Maturidi) concerning the aberrations in Islamic sects and streams.

== See also ==
- Sarvadarśanasaṅgraha
- Diels–Kranz numbering
