= Sotion (Pythagorean) =

Sotion (Ancient Greek: Σωτίων, gen.: Σωτίωνος; fl. 1st century AD), a native of Alexandria, was a Greek Neopythagorean philosopher who lived in the age of Tiberius. He belonged to the school of the Sextii, which was founded by Quintus Sextius and combined Pythagoreanism with Stoicism. Sotion was the teacher of Seneca the Younger, who "sat as a lad, in the school of the philosopher Sotion." Seneca derived from him his admiration of Pythagoreanism, and quotes Sotion's views concerning vegetarianism and the migration of the soul:

You do not believe that souls are assigned, first to one body and then to another, and that our so-called death is merely a change of abode? You do not believe that in cattle, or in wild beasts, or in creatures of the deep, the soul of him who was once a man may linger? You do not believe that nothing on this earth is annihilated, but only changes its haunts? And that animals also have cycles of progress and, so to speak, an orbit for their souls, no less than the heavenly bodies, which revolve in fixed circuits? Great men have put faith in this idea; therefore, while holding to your own view, keep the whole question in abeyance in your mind. If the theory is true, it is a mark of purity to refrain from eating flesh; if it be false, it is economy. And what harm does it do to you to give such credence? I am merely depriving you of food which sustains lions and vultures.

It was perhaps this Sotion who was the author of a treatise on anger, quoted by Stobaeus. Plutarch also quotes a Sotion as the authority for certain statements respecting towns founded by Alexander the Great in India, which he had heard from his contemporary Potamo of Mytilene. He may be the same Sotion who is quoted by John Tzetzes as the authority for some other statements relating to India.
