= Aetius (philosopher) =

1st- or 2nd-century AD Greek doxographer and philosopher

Aetius (/eɪˈiːʃiəs/; Greek: Ἀέτιος) was a 1st- or 2nd-century AD doxographer and Eclectic philosopher.

== Works ==
None of Aetius' works survives today, but he solves a mystery about two major compilations of philosophical quotes. There are two extant books named De Placitis Philosophorum (Περὶ τῶν ἀρεσκόντων φιλοσόφοις φυσικῶν δογμάτων, "Opinions of the Philosophers") and Eclogae Physicae (Ἐκλογαὶ φυσικαὶ καὶ ἠθικαί, "Physical and Moral Extracts"). The first of these is by Pseudo-Plutarch and the second is by Stobaeus. They are clearly both abridgements of a larger work. Hermann Diels, in his great Doxographi Graeci (1879), discovered that the 5th-century CE theologian Theodoret had full versions of the quotes which were shortened in the abridgements. This means that Theodoret had managed to procure the original book which Pseudo-Plutarch and Stobaeus had shortened. He calls this book "Aetiou tên peri areskontôn sunagôgên (Ἀετίου περὶ τῶν Ἀρεσκόντων Συναγωγήν)" and therefore we ascribe the original Placita to Aetius.

Diels claimed that Aetius himself was merely abridging a work which Diels (1879) called Oldest Tenets or, in Latin, Vetusta Placita. Unlike Aetius, whose existence is attested by Theodoret, the Vetusta Placita is Diels' invention and is generally disregarded by modern classicists.

Quotes which are ascribed to Aetius in scholarly essays were actually discovered in either the abridgements of Pseudo-Plutarch or Stobaeus, or Theodoret's full quotes in rare cases, or finally one of several ancient authors who provided corrections to misquotes in one of these works.
