= Heraclides of Tarsus =

Stoic philosopher

Heraclides of Tarsus (Ancient Greek: Ἡρακλείδης, fl. 2nd century BC) was a Stoic philosopher native to Tarsus, Mersin. He was a friend of Antipater of Tarsus, the sixth scholarch of the Stoa. As a pupil of Antipater, he studied with Archedemus of Tarsus and Aristocreon, the nephew of Chrysippus.

Along with Athenodoros Cananites, Heraclides argued that moral offenses are not equal and have degrees.

Remnants of a table of contents from one of the manuscripts (manuscript P) of Diogenes Laërtius' Lives and Opinions of Eminent Philosophers showed a chapter on the life of Heraclides of Tarsus.
