= Apollophanes of Antioch =

Stoic philosopher

Apollophanes of Antioch (Ancient Greek: Ἀπολλοφάνης; fl. 250 BC) was a Stoic philosopher. During his life, he left the Seleucid Empire for Athens. There he became a pupil and friend of Aristo of Chios. As a student of Aristo, he may have call himself an Aristonian. There is some assertion that he is the same as Apollophanes the physician who lived at the court of Antiochus.

== Philosophy ==
Apollophanes' natural philosophy is similar to Poseidonius', that the world is one and finite, having a spherical form with a vacuum around it.

Among the Stoics, there was much discussion concerning the number of virtues and parts of the soul. On the number of virtues Cleanthes, Chrysippus, and Antipater suggest that there are many; Poseidonius suggests that there are four; traditional Stoics suggest that there are three (the logical, the natural, and the ethical); Panaetius teaches that there are only two (the speculative and the practical); while Apollophanes taught that there is only one virtue – prudence. On the parts of the soul Plato divided it into two parts; Zeno into three; Panaetius into five or six; Soranus into seven; Chrysippus into as many as eight; Apollophanes into as many as nine; while other Stoics declared as many as twelve parts in the soul.

== Works ==
According to Athenaeus of Naucratis, Apollophanes had written a book about his master, Aristo of Chios, entitled Ariston. The book concerned Aristo's addiction to pleasure, despite being a stoic. Eratosthenes of Cyrene, who was also Aristo's pupil, wrote a similar book also concerning Aristo's addiction to luxury. Diogenes Laertios mentioned another book titled Natural Philosophy, in which Apollophanes described the vacuum.
