= School of the Sextii =

Ancient Roman school of philosophy

The School of the Sextii was an eclectic Ancient Roman school of philosophy founded around 50 BC by Quintus Sextius the Elder and continued by his son, Sextius Niger, however it went extinct shortly after in 19 AD due to the ban on foreign cults. The school blended elements of Pythagorean, Platonic, Cynic, and Stoic philosophy together with a belief in an elusive incorporeal power pervades the body in order to emphasize asceticism, honesty, and moral training through nightly examinations of conscience as a means of achieving eudaimonia. The primary sources of information on the school are Seneca the Younger, who was taught by one of its members named Sotion, and the 5th century writer Claudianus Mamertus. Other members of the school included Papirius Fabianus, Crassicius Pasicles, Celsus. While Seneca the Younger often conflates the school with Stoicism, the Sextians were not as inclined to rigorous logical exercises or any abstruse abstract thinking, and unlike the Stoics, advocated avoidance of politics, engaging in the correspondence between words and life, and vegetarianism.

== See also ==
- Neopythagoreanism
- History of vegetarianism
