= Heraclides Lembus =

2nd-century BC Greek statesman, historian and writer

- Ἡρακλείδης Λέμβος
- Born: c. 2nd century BC; Callatis or Alexandria
- Occupations: Historian, statesman, civil servant

Philosophical work
- Era: Hellenistic philosophy
- Region: Ancient Greek philosophy
- Language: Ancient Greek
- Main interests: Doxography
- Notable works: Successions of the Philosophers

Heraclides Lembus (Ancient Greek: Ἡρακλείδης Λέμβος, Hērakleidēs Lembos) was an Ancient Greek statesman, historian and philosophical writer whose works only survive in fragments quoted in later authors.

== Life ==
Heraclides was an Egyptian civil servant who lived during the reign of Ptolemy VI Philometor (2nd century BC). The Suda mentions a Heraclides of Oxyrhynchus, but according to Diogenes Laërtius he originated from Callatis or Alexandria.He was the son of a man named Sarapion ('Lembus' is a nickname meaning 'cockboat'). He is said to have negotiated the treaty that ended Antiochus IV's invasion of Egypt in 169 BC. That Agatharchides of Cnidus became known by being his secretary is further evidence to his importance in the Ptolemaic administration.

== Works ==
His works (mainly excerpts and epitomes from earlier writers) survive only in fragments.

- Histories (Ἱστορίαι) in at least 37 books. The extant fragments discuss the following topics: a frog plague in Paeonia and Dardania; Demetrius Poliorcetes and his father Antigonus Monophthalmus in love with the courtesan Demo; philological eccentricities concerning Alexarchus, the brother of Cassander inventing words. Traditionally, two further fragments are attributed to the Histories on the foundation of Rome by Greeks returning from the Trojan war and on the Spartan king Archidamus II; however, these might actually belong to Heraclides' epitome of Aristotle's Constitutions. An epitome was, presumably, made by Hero of Athens, a rhetor tentatively dated to the first century AD.
- Lembeutikos Logos (Λεμβευτικὸς λόγος), about which nothing is known, apart from an obscure connection to his nickname.
- an epitome of Sotion's Successions of Philosophers.
- an epitome of Satyrus' Lives.
- an epitome of Hermippus's On Lawgivers, On the Seven Sages and On Pythagoras.
- excerpts from an epitome of Aristotle's Constitutions (Πολιτεῖαι) and Barbarian Customs (Νόμιμα βαρβαρικά). The fragments of these largely lost works (only the Constitution of the Athenians (Aristotle) extant) were published in 1847 as Heraclidis politiarum quae extant, by F. G. Schneidewin.
- a biography of Archimedes (doubtful), mentioned by Eutocius.

== Criticism ==
As a historian Heraclides has been discounted, as the selection criteria in his epitome of Aristotle's Constitutions show a certain inclination towards the weird and sensational, e.g.:

Pantaleon, who was overbearing and severe, ruled among them [the Elians]. He castrated ambassadors who had come to him, and compelled them to eat their testicles.

— Constitution of the Elians, Dilts (1971) Excerpt no. 21, p. 23

His prime merit lies in the faithful transmission of otherwise lost sources (e.g. the missing first part of the Constitution of the Athenians). The Histories were, presumably, criticised by Dionysius of Halicarnassus in The Arrangement of Words with regard to his Asiatic style.
