= Marcus Vigellius =

Stoic philosopher

Marcus Vigellius (fl. 125 BC) was a Stoic philosopher. He was a friend and pupil of Panaetius, whom he also lived with. He is noted by Cicero in De Oratore to have also been a friend of Lucius Licinius Crassus, the greatest Roman orator prior to Cicero. All other information has been lost.

== See also ==
- List of Stoic philosophers
