= Basilides of Scythopolis =

Basilides of Scythopolis (fl. 150 AD) was a philosopher, probably a Stoic. According to the Chronicle of Jerome, he was one of the "illustrious" teachers of Marcus Aurelius. Jerome calls him Scythopolitanus, which implies that he came from Scythopolis in Palestine.

Basilides is not mentioned by Marcus in any of his works. The same information as in Jerome also appears in George Syncellus. Basilides has an entry in the medieval De vita et moribus philosophorum, which claims that he taught in Athens during the reign of Antoninus Pius (r. 138–161).

There is no basis for identifying him with the hypermaterialist Basilides, also a Stoic, nor with the contemporary Gnostic Basilides.
