= Mnesarchus of Athens =

Greek Stoic philosopher (c. 160 – c. 85 BC)

Mnesarchus or Mnesarch (Greek: Μνήσαρχος, Mnēsarkhos), of Athens, was a Stoic philosopher, who lived c. 160 – c. 85 BC.

== Biography ==
Mnesarchus was a pupil of Diogenes of Babylon and Antipater of Tarsus. Cicero says that he was one of the leaders of the Stoic school (Latin: principes Stoicorum) at Athens together with Dardanus at a time when Antiochus of Ascalon was turning away from scepticism (c. 95 BC). He was the teacher of Antiochus for a time, and he may also have taught Philo of Larissa. After the death of Panaetius (109 BC), the Stoic school at Athens seems to have fragmented, and Mnesarchus was probably one of several leading Stoics teaching in this era. He was probably dead by the time Cicero was learning philosophy in Athens in 79 BC.

Cicero mentions him several times and seems to have been familiar with some of his writings:

Mnesarchus himself, said, that those whom we call orators were nothing but a set of mechanics with glib and well-practised tongues, but that no one could be an orator but a man of true wisdom; and that eloquence itself, as it consisted in the art of speaking well, was a kind of virtue, and that he who possessed one virtue possessed all, and that virtues were in themselves equal and alike; and thus he who was eloquent possessed all virtues, and was a man of true wisdom.
