= Satyrus the Peripatetic =

3rd-century BC Greek philosopher and historian

Satyrus (Ancient Greek: Σάτυρος) of Callatis was a distinguished Peripatetic philosopher and historian, whose biographies of famous people are frequently referred to by Diogenes Laërtius and Athenaeus. He came from Callatis Pontica, as was learned from a Herculaneum papyrus. He lived earlier than the reign of Ptolemy VI Philometor (181–146 BC) when his Lives were epitomized by Heraclides Lembus, probably during the 3rd century BC. Athenaeus frequently refers to him as a Peripatetic, but his connection to the Peripatetic school is otherwise unknown. His biographies dealt with many eminent people including kings (Dionysius the Younger, Philip), statesmen (Alcibiades), orators (Demosthenes), poets (Aeschylus, Sophocles, Euripides), and philosophers (Bias of Priene, Chilon of Sparta, Pythagoras, Empedocles, Zeno of Elea, Anaxagoras, Socrates, Diogenes, Anaxarchus, Stilpo). He also wrote on the population of Alexandria, and a work On Characters (Περὶ χαρακτήρων). Fragments of his biography of the Athenian dramatist Euripides were found at the end of a papyrus scroll discovered at Oxyrhynchus in the early twentieth century.
