= Straticles =

Ancient Greek Stoic philosopher

Stratichles (Ancient Greek: Στρατικλῆς) was an ancient Greek philosopher or historian of philosophy who wrote a work about the history of the Stoic school of thought called On Stoics. The work belongs to the same genre as the many works of the time, called Successions of Philosophers, except that it focused on the history of one school. Otherwise, little is known about his life or timing.
