= Sosigenes (Stoic) =

Stoic philosopher

Sosigenes (Ancient Greek: Σωσιγένης; fl. 100 BC) was an ancient Greek philosopher of the Stoic school. He was a student of Antipater of Tarsus.

There is not much known about Sosigenes and his thought. The Lives and Opinions of Eminent Philosophers by Diogenes Laërtius in Book VII contained his biography, but that portion of the book has disappeared; only the mention of the name in the table of contents remains. According to Alexander of Aphrodisias, Sosigenes was influenced by Aristotle and modified stoic doctrines accordingly.
