= Arellius Fuscus =

1st century BC Roman orator and teacher

Arellius Fuscus (or Aurelius Fuscus) was an ancient Roman orator. He spoke with ease in both Latin and Greek, in an elegant and ornate style. Charles Thomas Cruttwell says that Arellius was an Asiatic, that is, a practitioner of an elevated oratorical style.

He was probably the teacher of Ovid (43 BC – 17/18 AD) and Pliny the Elder (23–79). He is mentioned in the Naturalis Historia of the latter. Another pupil was Papirius Fabianus.
