= Nicias of Nicaea =

Nicias (Greek: Νικίας) of Nicaea, was a biographer and historian of ancient Greek philosophers. Nothing is known about his life, he may have lived in the 1st century BC or AD. He is repeatedly referred to by Athenaeus. His principal work seems to have been a Successions (Greek: Διαδοχαί), a history of the various schools of philosophy. Athenaeus also mentions a work On the Philosophers (Greek: Περὶ τῶν Φιλοσοφῶν), A third work, a History of Arcadia (Greek: Ἀρκαδικά) is also referred to, but whether it is by this Nicias is unclear.
