= Zeno of Tarsus =

3rd century BC Greek Stoic philosopher

Zeno of Tarsus (Ancient Greek: Ζήνων ὁ Ταρσεύς, Zenon ho Tarseus; fl. 200 BC) was a Stoic philosopher and the son of Dioscorides.

== Biography ==
Zeno was a pupil of Chrysippus, and when Chrysippus died c. 206 BC, he succeeded him to become the fourth scholarch of the Stoic school in Athens.

According to Diogenes Laërtius, he wrote very few books, but left a great number of disciples. According to the testimony of Philodemus, Zeno rebutted the opinions of the Peripatetic philosopher Hieronymus of Rhodes in "five books Against Hieronymus" (Philodemus, Sto. hist., col. 48, fr. 18).

Little is known about Zeno's philosophical views. He was apparently an orthodox Stoic, but doubted the doctrine of the conflagration of the universe. This was a considerable modification of the physical theory of the Stoics, who held that the universe periodically dissolved into fire.

It is not known when he died. He was succeeded as head of the Stoic school by Diogenes of Babylon.

Preceded by Chrysippus	Leader of the Stoic school 206 – ? BC	Succeeded by Diogenes of Babylon
