= Jason of Nysa =

Ancient Greek philosopher

Jason of Nysa (Greek: Ἰάσων ὁ Νυσαεύς, Iásōn ho Nysaeús / Iason o Nysaevs; 1st-century BC) was a Stoic philosopher, the son of Menecrates, and, on his mother's side, grandson of Posidonius, of whom he was also the disciple and successor at the Stoic school at Rhodes. He therefore flourished after the middle of the 1st century BC. The Suda lists four works of his:

- Βίοι Ἐνδόξων Bíoi Endóxōn / Vii Endoxon – Famous Lives
- Φιλοσόφων Διαδοχαί Philosóphōn Diadochaí / Filosofon Diadoche – Successions of Philosophers
- Βίος Ἑλλάδος Bíos Helládos / Vios Ellados – Life of Greece, in 4 books
- Περὶ Ῥόδου Perì Rhódou / Peri Rodou – On Rhodes

However, the Suda expresses doubt about whether the third book is his, and also credits Jason of Argos as having written a Life of Greece in 4 books.
