= Herillus =

Stoic philosopher

Herillus (/ˈhɛrələs/; also Erillus /ˈɛrələs/; Ancient Greek: Ἥριλλος Herillos; fl. 3rd century BC) of Chalcedon (or Carthage), was a Stoic philosopher and a pupil of Zeno of Citium.

== Philosophy ==
Herillus differed significantly from Zeno's teachings and held that knowledge (ἑπιστήμη) was the goal (τέλος) of life:

Herillus said that the chief good was knowledge; that is to say, always conducting one's self in such a way as to refer everything to the principle of living according to knowledge, and not being misled by ignorance.

He said that there was also a second subordinate goal (ὑποτελής, hypoteles). This subordinate goal was related to the Stoic term oikeiôsis (οἰκείωσις): the primary impulse of living creatures. He stated that even people who were not wise aimed at the subordinate goal, but only wise people aimed at the principal goal.

Herillus was accused by Cicero of suggesting that there were two separate goals in life:

For we shall have to adopt two different plans of conduct in life: for he makes out that there are two chief goods unconnected with each other; but if they were real goods, they ought to be united; but at present they are separated, so that they never can be united.

Herillus also regarded the practicalities of everyday life, although necessary, as having no ethical value, because it did not contribute to the supreme good, and for this reason Cicero frequently associates him with the rather different philosophy of Aristo of Chios.

== Writings ==
Herillus is said to have written the following works:

- Περὶ ἀσκήσεως – On Training
- Περὶ παθῶν – On the Passions
- Περὶ ὐπολήψεως – On Judgment
- Νομοθέτης – The Lawmaker
- Μαιευτικός – Maieutics
- Άντιφέρων – The Adversary
- Διδάσκαλος – The Teacher
- Διασκευάζων – The Preparer
- Εὐθύνων – The Corrector
- Ἑρμῆς – Hermes
- Μήδεια – Medea
- Θέσεων ἠθικῶν – Ethical theses
- Some dialogues
