= Basilides (grammarian) =

Ancient Greek grammarian

Basilides (Ancient Greek: Βασιλείδης) was a grammarian of ancient Greece. He wrote a work on the dialect of Homer (περὶ λέξεως Ὁμηρικῆς), of which an epitome was later made by a writer named Cratinus. The work is quoted several times in the lexical encyclopedia known as the Etymologicum Magnum, but both the original work and its epitome are lost.

His time is unknown, though modern scholars believe he lived in either the imperial period or late antiquity.
