= The Prophecy of Basilides =

Painting by Pietro Testa

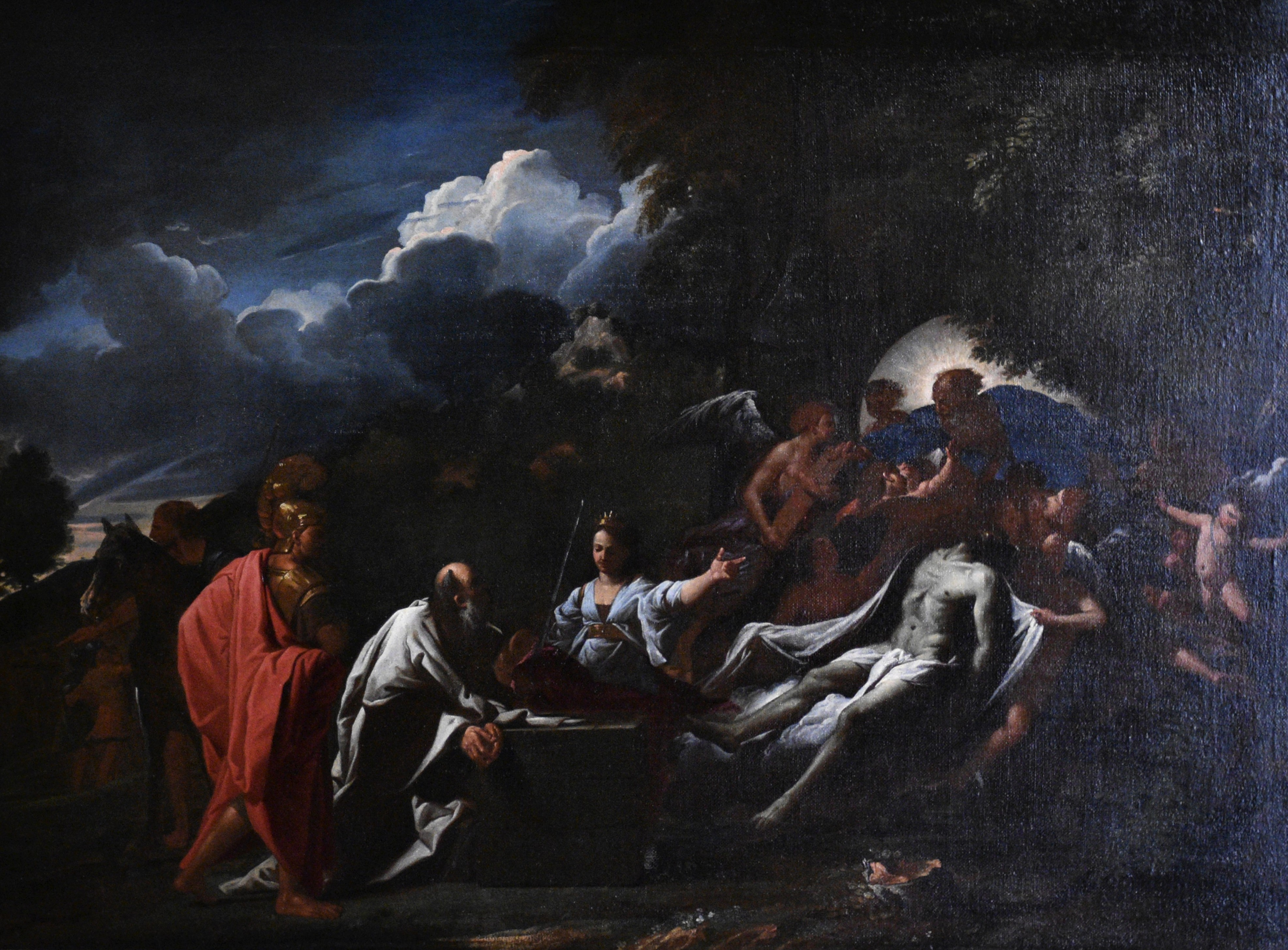

The Prophecy of Basilides is a 1645-1646 painting by Pietro Testa, who also conceived it as an engraving but did not live long enough to produce the latter. The work was transposed onto copper, perhaps shortly after Testa's death, by his nephew Giovanni Cesare Testa. It is now in the National Museum of Capodimonte, with a preparatory drawing for its figure of Christ now in the British Museum.

It draws on accounts in Suetonius's Life of Vespasian, Tacitus' Histories (III, 78) and other ancient Latin historical texts on the Jewish Revolt, stating that Vespasian went to an unnamed priest living on Mount Carmel for a prophecy about the outcome of his campaign. However, the painting's main source is the re-reading of the episode in Carmelite literature, which gives the priest the name Basilides and sees him and Elijah as antecedents of their order.
