= Sosicrates =

2nd-century BC Greek historian

Sosicrates of Rhodes (Greek: Σωσικράτης ὁ Ῥόδιος; fl. c. 180 BC) was a Greek historical writer. He was born on the island of Rhodes and is noted, chiefly, for his frequent mention by Diogenes Laërtius in his Lives and Opinions of Eminent Philosophers, referencing Sosicrates as the sole authority behind such facts as Aristippus having written nothing. It is inferred that Sosicrates flourished after Hermippus and before Apollodorus of Athens, and, therefore, sometime between 200 and 128 BC. Sosicrates is claimed to have penned A Succession of Philosophers, quoted by both Athenaeus and Diogenes Laërtius. Sosicrates also composed a work on the history of Crete, though neither of the aforementioned works has survived.

== Sources ==
- Dictionary of Greek and Roman Biography and Mythology, vol. 3, page 882
