= Dioscorides (Stoic) =

Stoic philosopher (fl. 225 BC)

Dioscorides (Ancient Greek: Διοσκορίδης, fl. 225 BC), sometimes known as Dioscurides, was a Stoic philosopher, the father of Zeno of Tarsus and a pupil of Chrysippus. All other information has been lost.

== Dedication ==
Chrysippus dedicated the following works to Dioscorides:

- Four books on Probable Conjunctive Reasons
- Five books on the Art of Reasoning and of Modes
- A solution, according to the principles of the ancients, of the law of non-contradiction
- Five volumes of Dialectic Arguments, with no solution
- Two books on Probable Arguments bearing on Definitions
- An essay on Rhetoric, spanning four books
