= Archedemus of Tarsus =

Ancient Greek Stoic philosopher

Archedemus of Tarsus (Greek: Άρχέδημος ὁ Ταρσεύς) was a Stoic philosopher who flourished around 140 BC. Two of his works: On the Voice (Greek: Περὶ Φωνῆς) and On Elements (Greek: Περὶ Στοιχείων), are mentioned by Diogenes Laërtius.

Archedemus is probably the same person as the Archedemus, whom Plutarch calls an Athenian, and who, he states, went into Parthia and founded a school of Stoic philosophers at Babylon.

Archedemus is also mentioned by Cicero, Seneca, Epictetus, and other ancient writers.
