= Claudianus Mamertus =

Gallo-Roman theologian

Claudianus Ecdidius Mamertus (died c. 473 AD) was a Gallo-Roman theologian and the younger brother of Saint Mamertus, Bishop of Vienne.

== Biography ==
Descended probably from one of the leading families of the country, Claudianus Mamertus relinquished his worldly goods and embraced the monastic life. He assisted his brother in the discharge of his functions, and Sidonius Apollinaris describes him as directing the psalm-singing of the chanters, who were formed into groups and chanted alternate verses, whilst the bishop was at the altar celebrating the sacred mysteries. This passage is of importance in the history of liturgical chant. In the same epigram, which constitutes the epitaph of Claudianus Mamertus, Sidonius also informs us that this distinguished scholar composed a lectionary, that is, a collection of readings from the Christians' scriptures to be made on the occasion of certain celebrations during the year.

== Writings ==
According to the same writer, Claudianus "pierced the sects with the power of eloquence", an allusion to a prose treatise entitled "On the State of the Soul" or "On the Substance of the Soul". Written between 468 and 472, this work was destined to combat the ideas of Faustus, Bishop of Reii (modern Riez, in the department of Basses-Alpes), particularly his thesis on the corporeity of the soul. Plato, whom he perhaps read in Greek, Porphyry, and especially Plotinus and Saint Augustine furnished Claudianus with arguments.

The 1913 Catholic Encyclopedia describes Claudianus's style as "decidedly peripatetic", highlighting his use of abstract adverbs and antiquated vocabulary. Claudianus studied the works of Apuleius, and, in a letter to rhetorician Sapaudus of Vienne, recommended Naevius, Plautus, Varro, and Gracchus as stylistic models. The resulting style led Sidonius to describe Claudianus as a modern antique.

Besides the treatise and the letter from Claudianus to Sidonius Apollinaris, found among the letters of the latter (IV, ii), some poetry has also been ascribed to him, although erroneously. For instance, he has been credited with the "Pange, lingua", which is by Venantius Fortunatus (Carm., II, ii); "Contra vanos poetas ad collegam", a poem recommending the choice of Christian subjects and written by Paulinus of Nola (Carm., xxii); two short Latin poems in honour of Christ, one by Claudian (Birt ed., p. 330; Koch ed., p. 248) and the other by Merobaudes (Vollmer ed., p. 19), and two other Greek poems on the same subject, again believed to be the work of Claudian.

Claudianus was the addressee of a volume of commentary by the bishop Salonius on the latter part of the book of Ecclesiastes.

== Reputation ==
Two facts assign Claudianus Mamertus a place in the history of thought: he took part in the reaction against Semipelagianism, which took place in Gaul towards the close of the fifth century and he was the precursor of Scholasticism, forestalling the system of Roscellinus and Abelard. The logical method pursued by Claudianus commanded the esteem and investigation of Berengarius of Tours, Nicholas of Clairvaux, secretary to Saint Bernard, and Richard de Fournival.

== See also ==
- School of the Sextii
