= Antisthenes of Rhodes =

Ancient Greek historian

Antisthenes of Rhodes (Greek: Ἀντισθένης ὁ Ῥόδιος; fl. c. 200 BCE ) was an ancient Greek historian. He took an active part in the political affairs of his country, and wrote a history of his own time, which, notwithstanding his bias towards his native island of Rhodes, is spoken of in terms of high praise by Polybius. He wrote an account of the Naval Battle of Lade (201 BCE) and was, according to Polybius, a contemporary with the events he described.

It is likely that this Antisthenes is the historian who wrote a Successions of the Greek philosophers, which is often referred to by Diogenes Laërtius. He might also be the Peripatetic philosopher cited by Phlegon of Tralles.

Plutarch mentions an Antisthenes who wrote a work called Meleagris, of which the third book is quoted; and Pliny the Elder speaks of an Antisthenes who wrote on the pyramids.
