= Lucius Plotius Gallus =

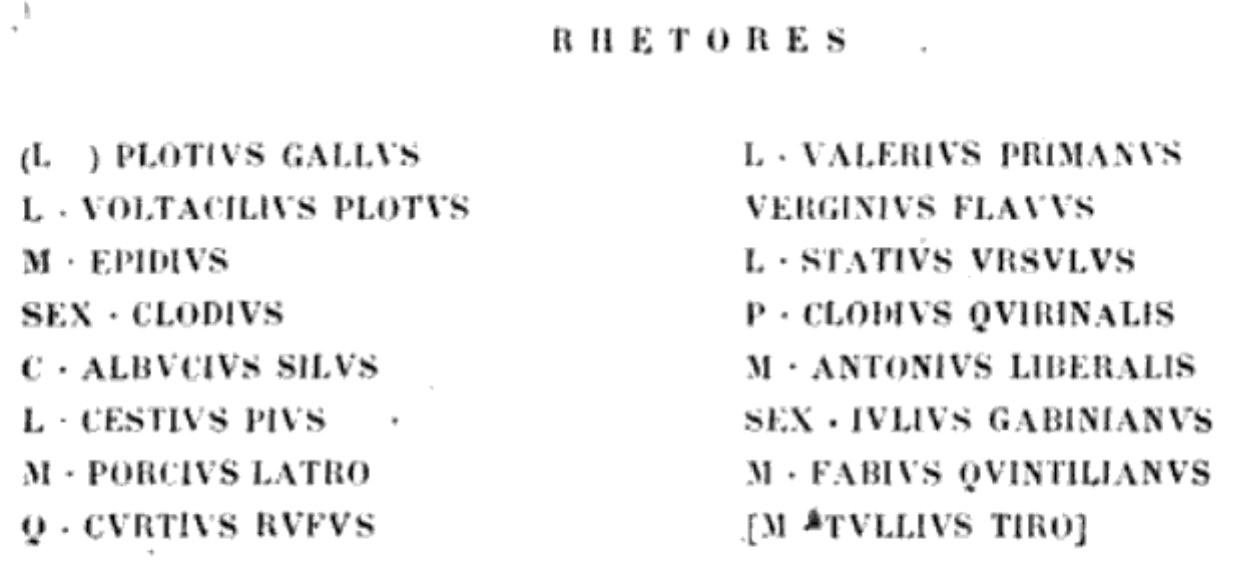
Plotius atop the list of rhetors preceding De Rhetoribus

Lucius Plotius Gallus (fl. 92–56 BC) was a Roman teacher of classical rhetoric.

Plotius was born between about 120 and 115 BC. The cognomen Gallus suggests that he was from Cisalpine Gaul. Little is known of his life. He was a supporter of Gaius Marius and an opponent of the optimates. He had opened a school of rhetoric in Rome by 92 BC, when the censors led by Lucius Licinius Crassus sought to close it. Suetonius, in his De Rhetoribus, records that he lived a very long time. In 56 BC, he wrote a speech for Atratinus' prosecution of Marcus Caelius Rufus.

The Rhetorica ad Herennium, written in the 80s, is generally taken as representative of his views. Quintilian, in his Institutio Oratoria, considers Plotius the greatest of the early Roman rhetors. He laid special emphasis on gesticulation. He is the first listed rhetor in the list of Latin rhetors that appears before De Rhetoribus in most manuscripts. According to the medieval De vita et moribus philosophorum, he was the first to teach Latin rhetoric in Rome. On Plotius, Suetonius quotes Cicero from a lost letter to Marcus Titinius:

I indeed remember back when we were boys and a certain man named Plotius began to teach in Latin. It so happened that students gathered near him since everyone of the most prominent students was drilled by him. For my own part, I was sorry that I was not permitted to do the same thing. Moreover, I was held back by the advice of very learned men who had thought that one's abilities could become better by certain exercises in Greek.

Marcus Caelius, however, mocked him as a "barley-bread rhetorician ... puffed, light and coarse."

== Bibliography ==
- Crosas López, Francisco, ed. (2002). Vida y costumbres de los viejos filósofos: la traducción castellana cuatrocentista del De vita et moribus philosophorum atribuido a Walter Burley. Iberoamericana Editorial Vervuert.
- Enos, Richard Leo (1972). "When Rhetoric Was Outlawed in Rome: A Translation and Commentary of Suetonius's Treatise on Early Roman Rhetoricians". Speech Monographs. 39 (1): 37–45. doi:10.1080/03637757209375736.
- Huelsenbeck, Bart (2023). Profiles in Roman Rhetoric: An Expanding Hand. Routledge.
- Schmidt, Peter L. (2006). "Plotius Gallus, L.". Brill's New Pauly Online. Brill.
