= Sextius Niger =

Roman writer on pharmacology during the reign of Augustus

Sextius Niger was a Roman writer on pharmacology during the reign of Augustus or a little later. He may be identical with the son of the philosopher Quintus Sextius, who continued his philosophical teachings.

== Life and work ==
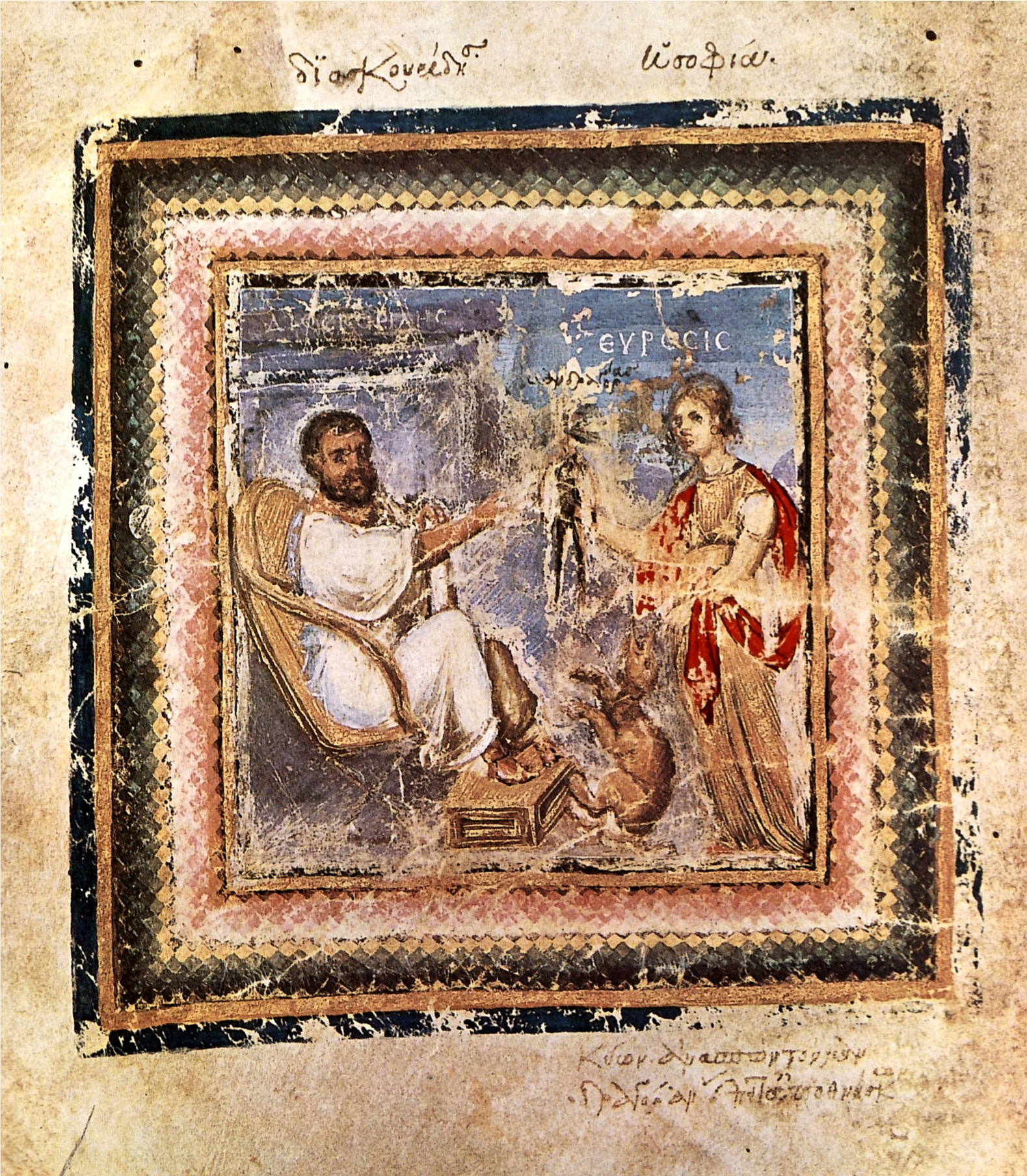
Dioscorides (pictured) used Sextius Niger as a source for his own pharmacological work

From Pedanius Dioscorides and Pliny the Elder, who mention his work, we can fix his time of writing to a period after Juba II, the king of Mauretania, had written his treatise on euphorbia, which Dioscorides and Pliny knew from Niger, and before Pliny himself wrote his Natural History, in other words from late in the first century B.C. to the first half of the first century A.D. Caelius Aurelianus (acut. 3, 16, 134) allows us to narrow the possible date further, by naming him as a friend of Tullius Bassus, who is cited by Scribonius Largus (121); since Scribonius wrote in the early to mid 40s, this should narrow his period to before 40 A.D.

His pharmacological work was a materia medica written in Greek and, according to Erotianus, had the title περὶ ὕλης ("On material", "On [medical] substances"). Dioscorides calls him a disciple of Asclepiades of Bithynia and speaks slightingly of him and others of the same school for a lack of care in investigating the remedies they recommend. Despite this disrespect, it seems clear that Niger was a major source for Dioscorides as he was for Pliny. Many of Pliny's books contain long stretches with close similarities to Dioscorides; and all these books are ones for which Pliny names Niger as one of his sources. Against the old view that Pliny was using Dioscorides, Wellmann notes that sometimes Pliny, sometimes Dioscorides provides a more detailed treatment and that the two were near contemporaries. Unlike Dioscorides, Pliny writes of Niger with great respect as "diligentissimus medicinae" ("a very diligent medical writer"); and Galen also regarded him highly. The work discussed medical effects of both plants and animals; its relation to folk beliefs can be seen in his comments on the salamander:

Sextius venerem accendi cibo earum, si detractis interaneis et pedibus et capite in melle serventur, tradit negatque restingui ignem ab iis.

Sextius says that sexual desire is increased by eating them, if they are preserved in honey with the guts and head and feet removed, but denies that fire can be put out by them.

From an examination of the parallel passages in Dioscorides and Pliny, Wellmann believes that his sources will have included the botanist Theophrastus and the writer on snakes Apollodorus.

Many think that Sextius Niger is also a philosopher, the son of Quintus Sextius and his successor as the head of a school of philosophy which flourished briefly around the time of Augustus, but had died out by the time of Seneca the Younger. The school had some resemblances to Stoicism, and recommended vegetarianism; although the elder Sextius wrote in Greek, the philosophy had a Roman character.

== See also ==
- School of the Sextii
- Sextia gens
- History of vegetarianism
