= Arellius =

Arellius was a Roman painter active in the 1st century BC, mentioned by Pliny.

== Life ==
Arellius was a painter of some celebrity, in Rome, a short time before the reign of Augustus. From the manner in which he is mentioned by Pliny, in Book 35 of his Natural History he must have possessed considerable ability. Pliny however reproaches him for his choice of models:

Arellius was in high esteem at Rome; and with fair reason, had he not profaned the art by a disgraceful piece of profanity; for, being always in love with some woman or other, it was his practice, in painting goddesses, to give them the features of his mistresses; hence it is, that there were always some figures of prostitutes to be seen in his pictures.

However, he never thought of making the same reproach against some of the greatest artists of Greece, who constantly availed themselves of the same practice.
