= Attalus (Stoic) =

1st-century Stoic philosopher

Attalus (/ˈætələs/ AT-əl-əs; Greek: Ἄτταλος) was a Stoic philosopher in the reign of Tiberius around 25 AD. He was defrauded of his property by Sejanus, and exiled where he was reduced to cultivating the ground. The elder Seneca describes him as a man of great eloquence, and by far the acutest philosopher of his age.

He taught the Stoic philosophy to Seneca the Younger, who frequently quotes him, and speaks of him in the highest terms. Seneca reminisces about Attalus in his 108th Letter:

This was the advice, I remember, which Attalus gave me in the days when I practically laid siege to his class-room, the first to arrive and the last to leave. Even as he paced up and down, I would challenge him to various discussions; for he not only kept himself accessible to his pupils, but met them half-way. His words were: "The same purpose should possess both master and scholar – an ambition in the one case to promote, and in the other to progress."

In the same letter, Seneca describes some of the Stoic training he received from Attalus:

And in truth, when he began to uphold poverty, and to show what a useless and dangerous burden was everything that passed the measure of our need, I often desired to leave his lecture-room a poor man. Whenever he castigated our pleasure-seeking lives, and extolled personal purity, moderation in diet, and a mind free from unnecessary, not to speak of unlawful, pleasures, the desire came upon me to limit my food and drink.

Of his written works, none survive. Seneca mentions a work of his on lightning; and it is supposed that he may be the author of the Proverbs referred to by Hesychius as written by one Attalus.
