= Apollonides (philosopher) =

Stoic philosopher

Apollonides (fl. 46 BC) was a Stoic philosopher. He was a friend and companion of Cato the Younger.

The sole record of Apollonides is within Plutarch's account of Cato the Younger in Parallel Lives. From this account, there is evidence that after the Battle of Thapsus, Apollonides was present with Cato at Utica. During this time, Cato ordered a young man named Statyllius to leave Utica. When Statyllius refused, Cato appointed Apollonides and Demetrius the Peripatetic to "reduce this man's swollen pride and restore him to conformity with his best interests." When Cato later inquired if Statyllius was sent off, Apollonides responded:

By no means... although we reasoned much with him; but he is lofty and unbending, and says he will remain and do whatever thou doest.

In preparation for his suicide, Cato had everyone present leave his side, with the exception of Apollonides and Demetrius. Cato's character is emphasized in this choice as "it says a great deal about Cato that he saved his last real conversation for his philosophers, not his son."
