= Diodotus the Stoic =

Ancient Greek Stoic philosopher

Diodotus (Greek: Διόδοτος; fl. 1st century BC) was a Stoic philosopher, and was a friend of Cicero.

He lived for most of his life in Rome in Cicero's house, where he instructed Cicero in Stoic philosophy and especially Logic. Although Cicero never fully accepted Stoic philosophy, he always spoke of Diodotus with fondness, and ranked him equal to other philosophers of his era such as Philo of Larissa, Antiochus and Posidonius.

In his later years, Diodotus went blind, but he nevertheless continued to teach:

The Stoic Diodotus, another man who lost his sight, lived for many years in my house. It seems hard to believe, but after he became blind he devoted himself more strenuously to philosophy than he ever had before. He also played the lyre, like a Pythagorean, and had books read to him day and night; he had no need of eyes to get on with his work. He also did something which seems scarcely credible for a man who could not see: he continued giving lectures on geometry, giving his pupils verbal indications of the points where they should begin and end the lines they had to draw.

He died in Cicero's house in 59 BC, and left his friend his entire property.
