= Papirius Fabianus =

1st century AD Roman rhetorician and philosopher

Papirius Fabianus was an Ancient Roman rhetorician and philosopher from the gens Papiria in the time of Tiberius and Caligula, in the first half of the 1st century AD.

== Biography ==
Fabianus was the pupil of Arellius Fuscus and of Blandus in rhetoric, and of Quintus Sextius in philosophy. Although much the younger of the two, he instructed Gaius Albucius Silus in eloquence. The rhetorical style of Fabianus is described by Seneca the Elder, and he is frequently cited in the third book of Controversiae as well as in the Suasoriae. His early model in rhetoric was his instructor Arellius Fuscus; but he afterwards adopted a less ornate form of eloquence.

Fabianus soon, however, abandoned rhetoric in favor of philosophy; and Seneca the Younger places his philosophical works next to those of Cicero, Asinius Pollio, and Livy the historian. The philosophical style of Fabianus is described by Seneca, and in some points his description corresponds with that of the elder Seneca. Both the Senecas seem to have known, and certainly greatly esteemed Fabianus.

Fabianus was the author of a work entitled [Rerum ?] Civilium; and his philosophical writings exceeded Cicero's in number. He had also paid great attention to physical science, and is called by Pliny the Elder rerum naturae peritissimus, "very experienced in matters of nature." From Seneca (Natur. Quaest. iii. 27), he appears to have written on physics; and his works entitled De Animalibus and Causarum Naturalium Libri are frequently referred to by Pliny.

== See also ==
- School of the Sextii
