= Basilides (Stoic) =

Stoic philosopher (2nd century BCE)

Basilides (Greek: Βασιλείδης; 2nd century BC), was a Stoic philosopher who denied the existence of incorporeal entities.

Nothing is known about the life of Basilides. From a table of contents in one of the medieval manuscripts, we know that he was listed in the missing part of Book VII of Diogenes Laërtius' Lives and Opinions of Eminent Philosophers. His position in the table of contents indicates that he lived around the time of Antipater of Tarsus in the 2nd century BC.

He is known principally from a passage in Sextus Empiricus, who notes that "Basilides and his followers thought no incorporeal [entity] exists." The specific context is the Stoic's theory of language. The Stoics held that any meaningful utterance will involve three items: the sounds uttered; the thing which is referred to or described by the utterance; and an incorporeal item, the lekton, that which is conveyed in the language. Basilides denied the existence of the lekta.
