= Aristo of Chios =

3rd-century BCE Stoic philosopher

Aristo of Chios (Greek: Ἀρίστων ὁ Χῖος Ariston ho Chios; fl. c. 260 BC), also spelled Ariston, was a Greek Stoic philosopher and colleague of Zeno of Citium. He outlined a system of Stoic philosophy that was, in many ways, closer to earlier Cynic philosophy. He rejected the logical and physical sides of philosophy endorsed by Zeno and emphasized ethics. Although agreeing with Zeno that Virtue was the supreme good, he rejected the idea that morally indifferent things such as health and wealth could be ranked according to whether they are naturally preferred. An important philosopher in his day, his views were eventually marginalized by Zeno's successors.

== Life ==
Aristo, son of Miltiades, was born on the island of Chios sometime around 300 BC. He came to Athens where he attended the lectures of Zeno of Citium, and also, for a time, the lectures of Polemo, (the head of the Academy from 314 to 269). Although he was a member of Zeno's circle he soon departed from Zeno's teachings, largely rejecting the two non-ethical parts of Stoic philosophy – physics and logic – endorsed by Zeno.

A man of persuasive eloquence, Aristo was such a good speaker that he was called the Siren. He was also called Phalanthus, from his baldness. He set up his own school in the Cynosarges gymnasium (a place associated with Cynic philosophy) and attracted many pupils, so much so that when he was accused of exposing the dignity of philosophy by his freedom to all-comers, he answered, that "he wished that Nature had given understanding to wild beasts, that they too might be capable of being his hearers." His followers called themselves Aristonians and included the scientist Eratosthenes and the Stoics: Apollophanes, Diphilus, and Miltiades.

Aristo engaged in much debate with Arcesilaus, the leader of the Academy, defending Stoic epistemology against Arcesilaus's skeptical views. On one occasion he accused Arcesilaus of being: "Plato the head of him, Pyrrho the tail, midway Diodorus". meaning that Arcesilaus presented himself as a Platonist, the substance of what he taught was the dialectics of Diodorus, but his actual philosophy was that of Pyrrhonism.

In his old age, he reportedly lapsed from the Stoic ideal and indulged in pleasure. "Eratosthenes the Cyrenean ... in his treatise which is entitled Ariston, represents his master as subsequently being much addicted to luxury, speaking as follows: "And before now, I have at times discovered him breaking down, as it were, the partition wall between pleasure and virtue, and appearing on the side of pleasure." And Apollophanes (and he was an acquaintance of Ariston), in his Ariston (for he also wrote a book with that title), shows the way in which his master was addicted to pleasure."

It is not known when he died, but he is supposed to have died from sunstroke on account of his baldness.

== Philosophy ==
Zeno divided philosophy into three parts: Logic (which was a very wide subject including rhetoric, grammar, and the theories of perception and thought); Physics (including not just science, but the divine nature of the universe as well); and Ethics, the end goal of which was to achieve happiness through the right way of living according to Nature. It is impossible to describe in full Aristo's philosophical system because none of his writings survived intact, but from the fragments preserved by later writers, it is clear that Aristo was heavily influenced by earlier Cynic philosophy:

=== Logic ===
Aristo regarded Logic as unimportant, saying that it had nothing to do with us. "Dialectic reasonings," he said, "were like cobwebs, artificially constructed, but otherwise useless." It is unlikely that he rejected all Logic, and it is notable that Zeno, too, compared the skills of dialecticians "to right measures that do not measure wheat or anything else worthwhile but chaff and dung." According to Stephen Menn, Aristo was the first to add "somehow disposed in relation to something" to the Stoic Categories.

=== Physics ===
Aristo also rejected Physics, saying that it was beyond us. This is reflected in his views concerning God:

Aristo holds that no form of God is conceivable, and denies him sensation, and is in a state of complete uncertainty as to whether he is, or is not, animate.

This was in marked opposition to Zeno to whom "the universe was animate and possessed of reason." He did, however, agree with Zeno that Nature was comprehensible, arguing against the Academics. He once asked an Academic "Do you not even see the man who is sitting next to you?", and when the Academic replied, "I do not," Aristo said: "Who then has blinded you; who has robbed you of your eyes?"

=== Ethics ===
For Aristo, Ethics was the only true branch of philosophy, but he also limited this category, removing its practical side: advice concerning individual actions was largely useless:

He holds that it does not sink into the mind, having in it nothing but old wives' precepts, and that the greatest benefit is derived from the actual dogmas of philosophy and from the definition of the Supreme Good. When a man has gained a complete understanding of this definition and has thoroughly learned it, he can frame for himself a precept directing what is to be done in a given case.

For Aristo, only the sage makes flawless decisions and does not need advice, for everybody else with clouded minds, advice is ineffective:

For precepts will be of no avail while the mind is clouded with error; only when the cloud is dispersed will it be clear what one's duty is in each case. Otherwise, you will merely be showing the sick man what he ought to do if he were well, instead of making him well.

The purpose of life was to seek the Supreme Good, and here Aristo set up a challenge to Zeno. While agreeing with Zeno that Virtue was the supreme good, he totally rejected the idea that external advantages (health, wealth, etc.), although morally "indifferent", could be ranked in terms of whether they are naturally preferred or not:

Aristo of Chios denied that health, and everything similar to it, is a preferred indifferent. To call it a preferred indifferent is equivalent to judging it a good, and different practically in name alone; For without exception things indifferent as between virtue and vice have no difference at all, nor are some of them preferred by nature while others are dispreferred, but in the face of the different circumstances of the occasions, neither those said to be preferred prove to be unconditionally preferred, nor are those said to be dispreferred of necessity dispreferred; For if healthy men had to serve a tyrant and be destroyed for this reason, while the sick had to be released from the service and, therewith also, from destruction, the wise man would rather choose sickness in this circumstance than health.

Zeno would have agreed that there could be circumstances when one might choose illness for the good of the world, but for Zeno, health is a naturally preferred state; Aristo rejected this. For Aristo, not only are there times when illness might be preferred over health, (health cannot always be unconditionally preferred), but health is not even a natural advantage, and one can never assume that it is better than illness. Although the sage can (and often must) choose between various indifferent things, he should never make the error of assuming that they could be naturally preferred.

For Zeno, the chief good was to live according to Nature; for Aristo, the chief good was:

to live in perfect indifference to all those things that are of an intermediate character between virtue and vice; making not the slightest difference between them, but regarding them all on a footing of equality. For that the wise man resembles a good actor; who, whether he is filling the part of Agamemnon or Thersites, will perform them both equally well.

The highest good is thus to follow virtue as the supreme good, avoid vice as the supreme evil, and to live in a state of perfect indifference towards everything else. Aristo did, however, agree with Zeno on the unity of virtue, even if it is often labelled as different things:

Aristo made virtue one thing in its essence, and called it health; but in what it is somehow related to, he made the virtues differentiated and plural, just as if one wanted to call our vision in grasping light-colored things light-sight, but dark-sight in grasping dark-colored ones. For virtue in considering things to be done and not to be done is called wisdom, but it is called temperance in bringing order to our appetites and defining what is measured and timely in pleasures, and justice in busying itself with joint enterprises and contracts with other people.

The problem remains of how one can achieve a virtuous state if one can not make rational choices between which things in life are preferred and dispreferred and has only an abstract goal of perfect virtue. Aristo left the question unanswered, and Cicero writing in the first century BC gave what has been the standard view of Aristo's philosophy ever since:

For if we maintained that all things were absolutely indifferent, the whole of life would be thrown in confusion, as it is by Aristo, and no function or task could be found for wisdom, since there would be absolutely no distinction between the things that pertain to the conduct of life, and no choice need be exercised among them.

Whether or not this view is correct, Aristo clearly thought he was doing something more positive than playing the Cynic and trying to undermine the roots of the Stoic system:

He who has equipped himself for the whole of life does not need to be advised concerning each separate item, because he is now trained to meet his problem as a whole; for he knows not merely how he should live with his wife or his son, but how he should live aright.

== Legacy ==
Aristo came to be regarded as a marginal figure in the history of Stoicism, but in his day, he was an important philosopher whose lectures drew large crowds. Eratosthenes, who lived in Athens as a young man, claimed that Aristo and Arcesilaus were the two most important philosophers of his age. But it was the more moderate Zeno, not the radical Aristo, whose views would win out. Chrysippus, (head of the Stoic school from c. 232 to c. 206 BC), systemized Stoicism along the lines set down by Zeno, and in doing so, was forced to repeatedly attack Aristo:

To maintain that the only Good is Moral Worth is to do away with the care of one's health, the management of one's estate, participation in politics, the conduct of affairs, the duties of life; nay, to abandon that Moral Worth itself, which according to you is the be-all and the end-all of existence; objections that were urged most earnestly against Aristo by Chrysippus.

And yet, Aristo never quite went away, as can be seen by the repeated references to his views by later writers. By outlining a version of Stoicism rooted in Cynic philosophy, he provided fruitful food for thought for both the supporters and the opponents of Stoicism ever since.
