= Quintus Sextius =

1st century BC Roman philosopher

Quintus Sextius the Elder (/ˈkwɪntəs ˈsɛkstiəs/; Latin: Quinti Sextii Patris; fl. c. 50 BC) was a Roman Neopythagorean philosopher, whose philosophy combined Pythagoreanism with Stoicism. Seneca frequently praised him.

== Life ==
Sextius was born no later than 70 BC. He founded a school of philosophy combining some features of the Pythagoreans with others of the Stoics; and which was consequently classed sometimes with one, and sometimes with the other of those sects. Seneca describes Sextius as a Stoic but mentions that Sextius himself denied it. From the Epistles of Seneca we learn that Sextius, though born of an illustrious family, had declined the office of Senator when offered him by Julius Caesar. He also subjected himself to a scrupulous self-examination at the close of each day; and he abstained from animal food, though for different reasons than those ascribed to Pythagoras:

Sextius believed that man had enough sustenance without resorting to blood, and that a habit of cruelty is formed whenever butchery is practised for pleasure.

Sextius' son succeeded him as head of his school. He may be identical with the writer on pharmacology, Sextius Niger. A Xystus Pythagoricus philosophus is recorded in Jerome's version of the Chronicon of Eusebius. He is also mentioned by Plutarch, and by the elder Pliny. Seneca writes (c. 65 AD) that the school was extinct.

== Work ==
Seneca delighted much in a work of Sextius, the title of which he does not give, but which he praises, as written with great power:

Ye Gods, what strength and spirit one finds in him! This is not the case with all philosophers; there are some men of illustrious name whose writings are sapless. They lay down rules, they argue, and they quibble; they do not infuse spirit simply because they have no spirit. But when you come to read Sextius you will say: "He is alive; he is strong; he is free; he is more than a man; he fills me with a mighty confidence before I close his book." I shall acknowledge to you the state of mind I am in when I read his works: I want to challenge every hazard; I want to cry: "Why keep me waiting, Fortune? Enter the lists! Behold, I am ready for you!"

It has sometimes been suggested that the extant Sentences of Sextus were (in their original form) written by Sextius.

== See also ==
- School of the Sextii
- Sextia gens

== Bibliography ==
- Omar Di Paola, The Philosophical Thought of the School of the Sextii, in Epekeina, vol. 4, n. 1–2 (2014), pp. 327–339.
- Italo Lana, "Sextiorum nova et Romani roboris secta", RFIC 31 (1953), 1–26 and 209–234.
- Eduard Zeller, Die Philosophie der Griechen (1880–1892), T. III, 1, pp. 675–682.
