= Diogenes of Babylon =

Ancient Greek Stoic philosopher

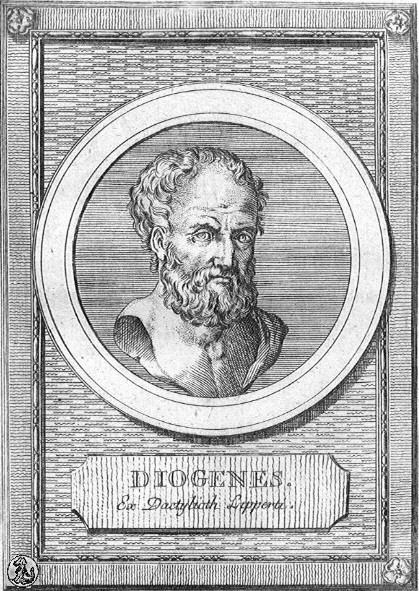

Diogenes of Babylon (also known as Diogenes of Seleucia; Ancient Greek: Διογένης Βαβυλώνιος; Latin: Diogenes Babylonius; c. 230 – c. 150/140 BC) was a Stoic philosopher. He was the head of the Stoic school in Athens, and he was one of three philosophers sent to Rome in 155 BC. He wrote many works, but none of his writings survived, except as quotations by later writers.

== Life ==
Born in Seleucia on the Tigris in Babylonia, Diogenes was educated at Athens under the auspices of Chrysippus and succeeded Zeno of Tarsus as head (scholarch) of the Stoic school there in the 2nd century BC. Among his pupils were Panaetius and Antipater of Tarsus who succeeded him as scholarch. He seems to have closely followed the views of Chrysippus, especially on dialectic, in which he is said to have instructed Carneades.

Together with Carneades and Critolaus, he was sent to Rome to appeal a fine of five hundred talents imposed on Athens in 155 BC for the sack of Oropus. They delivered their epideictic speeches first in numerous private assemblies, then in the Senate. Diogenes pleased his audience chiefly by his sober and temperate mode of speaking.

Cicero speaks of him as deceased by 150 BC, and since Lucian claims that he died at the age of 80, he must have been born around 230 BC. There is some evidence, however, that he may have lived to around 140 BC.

== Works ==
Cicero calls Diogenes "a great and important Stoic". In the works of the Epicurean philosopher Philodemus found in carbonized papyrus rolls recovered from the ruins of the Villa of the Papyri at Herculaneum, Diogenes is discussed more frequently than any philosopher besides Epicurus himself.

He was the author of several works, of which, however, little more than the titles is known:

- Διαλεκτικὴ τέχνη – Dialectic Art.
- On Divination.
- On Athena.
- Περὶ τοῦ τῆς ψυχῆς ἡγεμονικοῦ – On the Ruling Faculty of the Soul.
- Περὶ φωνῆς – On Speaking.
- Περὶ εὐγενείας – Οn Noble Βirth.
- Περὶ νόμων – On Laws.

In addition, it appears from Philodemus that he wrote extensive works On Music and On Rhetoric. Some aspects of his views on these two subjects are recoverable from the critical remarks to be found in Philodemus' works on these two subjects. There are several passages in Cicero from which we may infer that Diogenes wrote on other subjects also, such as duty, the highest good, and the like.

=== On Music ===
The opinions of Diogenes on music are known through the fragmentary treatise by Philodemus, On Music, which discusses the views of Diogenes. According to Philodemus, Diogenes held that music not only can calm the emotions, but that listening to music can produce harmony and proportion in the soul. Diogenes believed that just as diet and exercise can produce a healthy body, so that music can bring health to the mind and can treat psychological illnesses. Music naturally pushes one to action. Diogenes uses the example of the trumpet, or similar military instrument, which can stir the soldier to bravery. Music is thus an art which leads to virtue.

== Notes ==
Preceded by Zeno of Tarsus	Leader of the Stoic school ? – 145 BC	Succeeded by Antipater of Tarsus
