= Panaetius =

2nd-century BC Greek philosopher

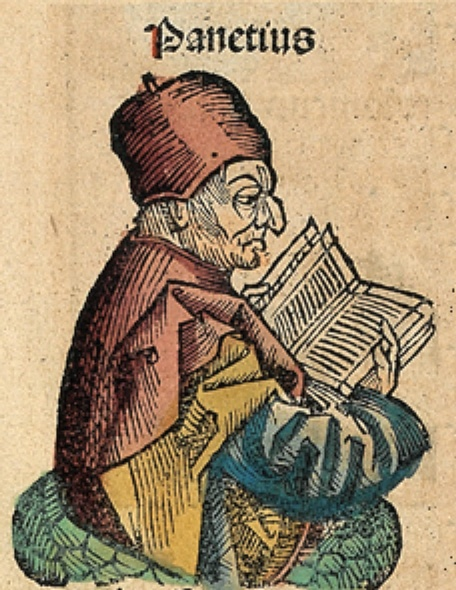
- Panaetius, depicted as a medieval scholar in the Nuremberg Chronicle
- Born: 185/180 BC; Rhodes
- Died: 110/109 BC; Athens

Philosophical work
- Era: Ancient philosophy
- Region: Western philosophy
- School: Stoicism
- Main interests: Ethics

Panaetius (/pəˈniːʃiəs/; Ancient Greek: Παναίτιος, romanized: Panaítios; c. 185 – c. 110/109 BC) of Rhodes was an ancient Greek Stoic philosopher. He was a pupil of Diogenes of Babylon and Antipater of Tarsus in Athens, before moving to Rome where he did much to introduce Stoic doctrines to the city, thanks to the patronage of Scipio Aemilianus. After the death of Scipio in 129 BC, he returned to the Stoic school in Athens, and was its last undisputed scholarch. With Panaetius, Stoicism became much more eclectic. His most famous work was his On Duties, the principal source used by Cicero in his own work of the same name.

== Life ==
Panaetius, son of Nicagoras, was born around 185–180 BC, into an old and eminent Rhodian family. He is said to have been a pupil of the linguist Crates of Mallus, who taught in Pergamum, and moved to Athens where he attended the lectures of Critolaus and Carneades, but attached himself principally to the Stoic Diogenes of Babylon and his disciple Antipater of Tarsus. Although it is often thought that he was chosen by the people of Lindos, on Rhodes, to be the priest of Poseidon Hippios, this was actually an honour bestowed upon his grandfather, who was also called Panaetius, son of Nicagoras

Probably through Gaius Laelius, who had attended the lectures of Diogenes and then of Panaetius, he was introduced to Scipio Aemilianus and, like Polybius before him, gained his friendship. Both Panaetius and Polybius accompanied him on the Roman embassy that Scipio headed to the principal monarchs and polities of the Hellenistic east in 139–138 BC. Along with Polybius, he became a member of the Scipionic Circle.

He returned with Scipio to Rome, where he did much to introduce Stoic doctrines and Greek philosophy. He had a number of distinguished Romans as pupils, amongst them Q. Scaevola the augur and Q. Aelius Tubero the Stoic. After the death of Scipio in spring 129 BC, he resided by turns in Athens and Rome, but chiefly in Athens, where he succeeded Antipater of Tarsus as head of the Stoic school. The right of citizenship was offered him by the Athenians, but he refused it. His chief pupil in philosophy was Posidonius. He died in Athens sometime in 110/09 BC, the approximate year in which L. Crassus the orator found there no longer Panaetius himself, but his disciple Mnesarchus.

== Philosophy ==
With Panaetius began the new eclectic shaping of Stoic theory; so that even among the Neoplatonists he passed for a Platonist. For this reason also he assigned the first place in philosophy to Physics, not to Logic, and appears not to have undertaken any original treatment of the latter. In Physics he gave up the Stoic doctrine of the conflagration of the universe; tried to simplify the division of the faculties of the soul; and doubted the reality of divination. In Ethics he recognised only a two-fold division of virtue, the theoretical and the practical, in contrast to the dianoetic and the ethical of Aristotle.

=== Ethics ===
Panaetius attempted to bring the ultimate goal of life closer to natural impulses, and to show by similes the inseparability of the virtues. Possibly as an answer to a similar criticism of stoicism given by Carneades, he stated virtue alone was not enough if there is no adequate living and health. He argued that the recognition of the moral, as something to be striven after for its own sake, was a fundamental idea in the speeches of Demosthenes. He rejected the doctrine of apatheia, and instead affirmed that certain pleasurable sensations could be regarded as in accordance with nature. He also insisted that moral definitions should be laid down in such a way that they might be applied by the person who had not yet attained to wisdom.

=== Politics ===
Panaetius believed the polis was born from a social contract among individuals wishing to retain their private property. He saw community as natural, and argued for treating even slaves with justice and proportionality. Despite his Platonic influence, however, he rejected the Platonic republic for considering it unrealistic and unnatural. He followed his colleague Polybius in seeing the Roman republic as an ideal combination of the three traditional forms of rule, incorporating the best of monarchy, aristocracy and democracy without falling in their shortcomings. Panetius went further and exalted Roman imperialism as an enterprise of justice, as the conquest and assimilation of barbarian peoples transformed their tribal anarchy into peace and order, preventing barbarians from abusing each other and subjecting them to the same law ruling Romans. His idea of justice was the rule of the most virtuous, not the strongest, with the conqueror being obligated to the conquered.

Panaetius considered war inhuman, but contemplated just war as a last resource to achieve peace and justice whenever peaceful means were impossible. This entailed two forms of just war, for retribution and for defense, both of which had to be officially declared. As conquest must be beneficial for everybody involved, he established the importance of treating the defeated in a civilized way, especially those who surrendered, even after a prolonged conflict.

== Writings ==
=== On Duties ===
The principal work of Panaetius was, without doubt, his treatise On Duties (Greek: Περί του Καθήκοντος) composed in three books. In this he proposed to investigate, first, what was moral or immoral; then, what was useful or not useful; and lastly, how the apparent conflict between the moral and the useful was to be decided; for, as a Stoic, he could only regard this conflict as apparent not real. The third investigation he had expressly promised at the end of the third book, but had not carried out; and his disciple Posidonius seems to have only timidly and imperfectly supplied what was needed.

Cicero wrote his own work On Duties in deliberate imitation of Panaetius, and stated that in the third section of the subject that he did not follow Posidonius, but instead that he had completed independently and without assistance what Panaetius had left untouched. To judge from the insignificant character of the deviations, to which Cicero himself calls attention, as for example, the attempt to define moral obligation, the completion of the imperfect division into three parts, the rejection of unnecessary discussions, small supplementary additions, in the first two books Cicero has borrowed the scientific contents of his work from Panaetius, without any essential alterations. Cicero seems to have been induced to follow Panaetius, passing by earlier attempts of the Stoics to investigate the philosophy of morals, not merely by the superiority of his work in other respects, but especially by the effort that prevailed throughout it, laying aside abstract investigations and paradoxical definitions, to demonstrate the philosophy of morals in its application to life.

Generally speaking, Panaetius, following Aristotle, Xenocrates, Theophrastus, Dicaearchus, and especially Plato, had softened down the severity of the earlier Stoics, and, without giving up their fundamental definitions, had modified them so as to be capable of being applied to the conduct of life, and clothed them in the garb of eloquence.

That Cicero has not reproduced the entire contents of the three books of Panaetius, we see from a fragment, which is not found in Cicero, preserved by Aulus Gellius, and which acquaints us with Panaetius's treatment of his subject in its rhetorical aspects.

=== Other works ===
Panaetius also wrote treatises concerning On Cheerfulness; On the Magistrates; On Providence; On Divination; a political treatise used by Cicero in his De Republica; and a letter to Quintus Aelius Tubero. His work On Philosophical Schools appears to have been rich in facts and critical remarks, and the notices which we have about Socrates, and on the books of Plato and others of the Socratic school, given on the authority of Panaetius, were probably taken from that work.

== Notes ==
Preceded by Antipater of Tarsus	Leader of the Stoic school 129–110 BC	Last undisputed head
