= Antipater of Tarsus =

Ancient Greek Stoic philosopher

Antipater of Tarsus (Greek: Ἀντίπατρος ὁ Ταρσεύς; died 130/129 BC) was a Stoic philosopher. He was the pupil and successor of Diogenes of Babylon as leader of the Stoic school, and was the teacher of Panaetius. He wrote works on the gods and on divination, and in ethics he took a higher moral ground than that of his teacher Diogenes.

== Life ==
Very little is known about Antipater's life, except that he was the disciple and successor of Diogenes of Babylon as leader of the Stoic school in Athens, and he was the teacher of Panaetius. The few extant accounts of his philosophical opinions would not be sufficient grounds for any great reputation, if it were not for the testimony of ancient authors to his merit. Plutarch speaks of him with Zeno, Cleanthes, and Chrysippus, as one of the principal Stoic philosophers, and Cicero mentions him as remarkable for acuteness. He seems to have taken the lead during his lifetime in the disputes constantly recurring between his own school and the Academy, although he is said to have felt himself so unequal in argument to his contemporary Carneades in public debates, that he confined himself to writing; by which he was called "Pen-noise" (Greek: καλαμοβόας).

== Philosophical work ==
Antipater taught belief in God as "a Being blessed, incorruptible, and of goodwill to men," and blamed those who ascribed to the gods "generation and corruption," which is said to have been the doctrine of Chrysippus. Besides this treatise on the gods, he also wrote two books on divination, a common topic among the Stoics, in which he proved the truth of the subject from the foreknowledge and benevolence of God, explained dreams to be supernatural intimations of the future, and collected stories of divination attributed to Socrates. He is said to have believed that Fate was a god, though it is not clear what was implied in this expression; and it appears from Athenaeus that he wrote a treatise entitled On Superstition (Greek: Περὶ Δεισιδαιμονίας).

Of Antipater's labours in moral philosophy nothing remains except a few scattered statements which concern points of detail, and have more to do with the application of moral precepts than with the principles themselves; such as they were, however, he took higher ground in solving them than his master Diogenes:

If a wise man should inadvertently accept counterfeit money for good, will he offer it as genuine in payment of a debt after he discovers his mistake?" Diogenes says, "Yes," Antipater, "No," and I agree with him. If a man knowingly offers for sale wine that is spoiling, ought he to tell his customers? Diogenes thinks that it is not required; Antipater holds that an honest man would do so.

Among other things, his work is known for providing the earlier source of the word misogyny (μισογυνία, misogunia). In his moral tract known as On Marriage (c. 150 BC) Antipater argues that marriage is the foundation of the state, and considers it to be based on divine (polytheistic) decree. He uses the word misogunia to describe the sort of writing the tragedian Euripides eschews, stating that he "reject[s] the hatred of women in his writing" (ἀποθέμενος τὴν ἐν τῷ γράφειν μισογυνίαν). He then offers an example of this, quoting from a lost play of Euripides in which the merits of a dutiful wife are praised.

== Notes ==
Preceded by Diogenes of Babylon	Leader of the Stoic school 145–129 BC	Succeeded by Panaetius
