= Aristoxenus (disambiguation) =

Aristoxenus (Ancient Greek: Ἀριστόξενος) is a name shared by several figures of ancient history:

== People ==
- Aristoxenus of Selinus, ancient Greek poet of the 4th or 5th century BCE
- Aristoxenus, Greek Peripatetic philosopher of the 4th century BCE
- Aristoxenus (physician), Greek physician of the 1st century BCE
- Aristoxenus of Cyrene, an obscure philosopher of unknown age

== Astronomy ==
- Aristoxenus (crater), impact crater on the planet Mercury named after the renowned philosopher
