= Simon the Shoemaker =

Greek philosopher (c. late 5th century BC)

Simon the Shoemaker (Ancient Greek: Σίμων Ἀθηναῖος, σκυτοτόμος; fl. c. late 5th century BC) was an associate of Socrates, and a 'working-philosopher'. He is known mostly from the account given in Diogenes Laërtius' Lives and Opinions of Eminent Philosophers. He is also mentioned in passing by Plutarch and Synesius; a pupil of Socrates, Phaedo of Elis, is known to have written a dialogue called Simon.

== Influence ==
Xenophon reports that because youths were not allowed to enter the Agora, they used to gather in workshops surrounding it. Socrates frequented these shops in order to converse with the merchants, Simon being one among them. Simon committed these conversations to writing, as far as he could remember them. These were the first Socratic dialogues. Indeed, Simon’s excellence in the art of shoemaking would have been a form of expertise that Socrates, of Plato's Apology, held up as the only example of genuine knowledge.

Simon's writings attracted the notice of Pericles, who offered to provide for him if Simon would come and reside with him. The cobbler refused on the grounds that he did not wish to surrender his independence.

=== Postmortem ===
As far as you are concerned, there is no one greater in wisdom, nor will there ever be.

— Aristippus, to Antisthenes on Simon the Shoemaker.

A number of later philosophers associated Simon with a certain philosophical way of life.

The Cynics seem to have idealized Simon. Among the surviving Cynic epistles, there are some spurious Socratic Letters, written in the 2nd or 3rd century, in which various pupils of Socrates, including Antisthenes, Aristippus, and Xenophon, debate philosophy from a Cynic point of view. Simon is described in these letters as an ideal Cynic-type figure. One of these letters purports to come from Simon himself, and is addressed to Aristippus:

I hear that you ridicule our wisdom in the presence of Dionysius. I admit that I am a shoemaker and that I do work of that nature, and in like manner I would, if it were necessary, cut straps once more for the purpose of admonishing foolish men who think that they are living in great luxury. Antisthenes shall be the chastiser of your foolish jests. For you are writing him letters which make fun of our way of life. But let what I have said to you in jest suffice. At any rate, remember hunger and thirst, for these are worth much to those who pursue self control.

In the Cataplus of Lucian, a group of dead people, including the tyrant Megapenthes, are carried to the Underworld in Charon's boat. Lucian pairs his ideal Cynic, Cyniscus, with the cobbler Micyllus, who is the only one who accepts his fate – albeit with resignation. Here, Lucian follows a literary convention of his time by pairing a Cynic with a shoemaker. (Note: Explicitly, pairs we have extant are Antisthenes with Simon, Crates with Philiscus, and Cyniscus with Micyllus.)

From influence of the Cynics, the Stoics drew inspiration from Simon as well. Zeno of Citium is said to have produced a collection of anecdotes about Crates. Stobaeus preserves one:

Zeno said that Crates was sitting in a shoemaker’s shop and reading aloud Aristotle’s Protrepticus, which he had written for Themison, the Cyprian king. In it he said that no one had more advantages for being a philosopher, for he had great wealth so that he could spend money on this activity and still have his reputation intact. And Zeno said that while Crates was reading, the shoemaker was attentive but all the while kept on with his stitching. And Crates said, "It seems to me, Philiscus, that I should write a Protrepticus for you, since I see that you have more advantages for being a philosopher than the man for whom Aristotle wrote."

== Historicity ==
=== Doubt ===
Some scholars have suggested that Simon was a purely fictional figure. The central contention of his existence is his omission in the works of Plato, Xenophon, and Aristophanes – the primary sources on Socrates. Other scholars, (Note: Referenced in the work of R. F. Hock, R. Hirzel and H. Hobein are offered as examples of dissenters of his fictionalization.) point out that absence of evidence is not evidence of absence.

If he is indeed fictional, he would have most likely been invented by Phaedo of Elis in his dialogue Simon - of which, only a few fragments survive.

=== Support ===
Archaeological investigations have revealed the remains of a shop near the Tholos in the southwest corner of the Agora of Athens which has yielded quantities of hobnails and the base of a 5th-century drinking cup with the word ΣΙΜΟΝΟΣ ("Simon's") inscribed on it. Skeptics assert that it cannot be certain if this is Simon's shop.

In the Cynic epistles, Simon is referenced by Antisthenes and Aristippus, and even partakes in the exchange. However, these letters are later Roman creations.

Within the Heracles of Antisthenes, references Simon. Thus, it would be unlikely that he would be a literary creation of two early writers: Antisthenes, and Phaedo of Elis.

In the recording of Simon's dialogues, Diogenes Laërtius' lack of order and the repetition of some titles point against the works being fabrication.

R. F. Hock concludes that the lack of information and interest on Simon the Shoemaker is testified by the fact that he "came to function in a very specific context" and he "was admired really only by strict Cynics."

== Works ==
According to Diog. 2.123, Simon's writings were the first Socratic dialogues. It has been suggested that all of his works could have fit under the length of two Stephanus pages.

As with Simon himself, the reality of these lost works has also been doubted, but the lack of any order in Diogenes’ list and the repetition of some titles point against its being a fabrication.

Diogenes Laërtius lists thirty-three conversations (dialogi) which were contained in one volume. The titles of his works are as follows:

- Of Being
- Of Courage: three dialogues
- Of Honour
- Of Judging
- Of Number
- Of Poetry
- Of the Gods
- Of the Good
- Of Virtue, that it cannot be taught
- On Deliberation
- On Diligence
- On Doing Ill
- On Efficiency
- On Good Eating
- On Greed
- On Guiding the People
- On Knowledge
- On Law
- On Love
- On Music
- On Philosophy
- On Poetry
- On Pretentiousness
- On Reason, or On Expediency
- On Teaching
- On the Art of Conversation
- On the Beautiful
- On the Just: two dialogues
- What is the Beautiful

However, in recent times it has been argued that what Diogenes Laërtius meant was, rather, that Simon had been the first with whom Socrates entertained philosophical conversations.
