= Arete of Cyrene =

4th-century BC Greek philosopher

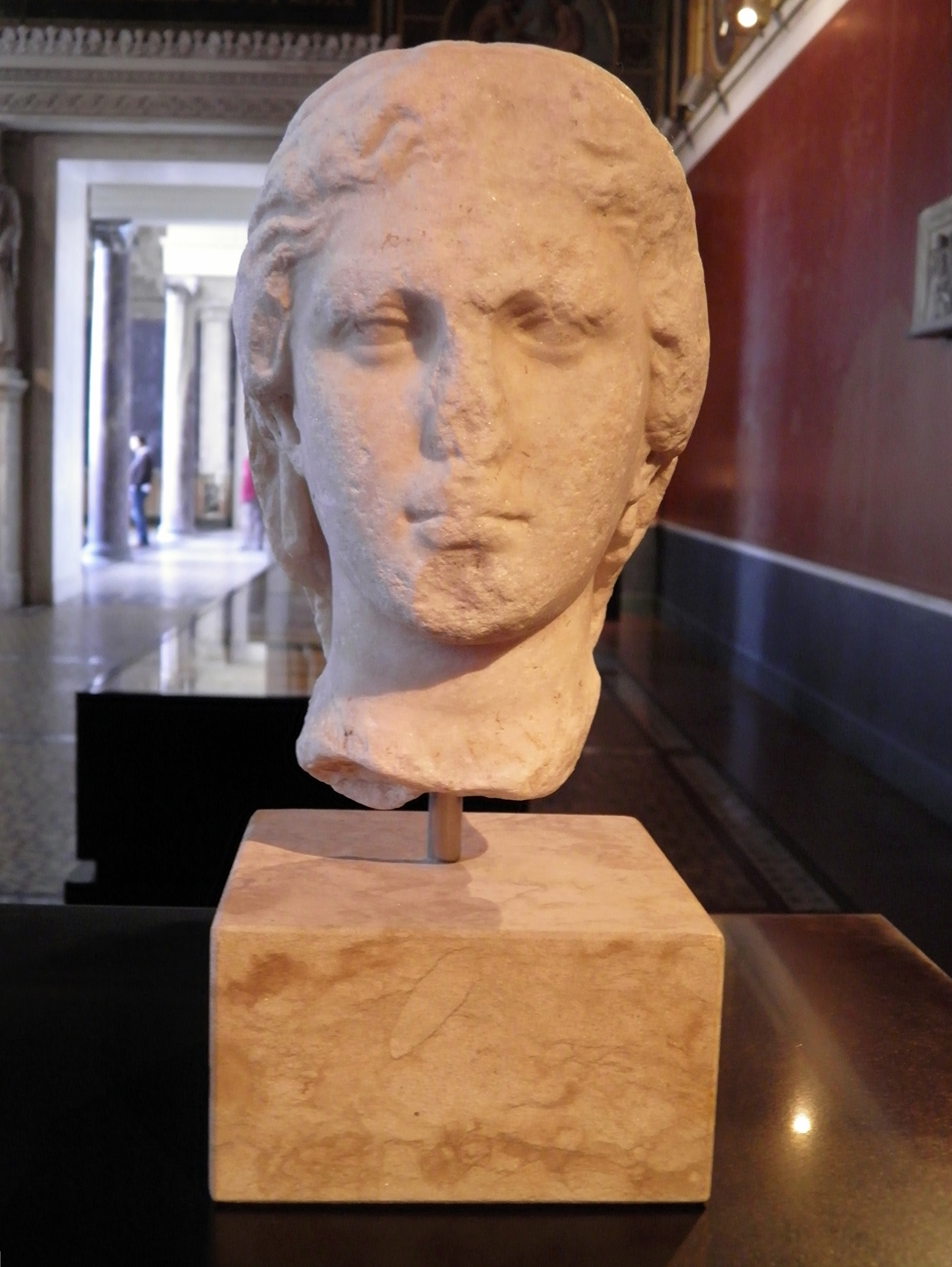
Marble head of a woman, possibly Arete. Roman copy of a 4th century BC original.

Arete of Cyrene (/əˈriːtiː/; Ancient Greek: Ἀρήτη; fl. 4th century BC) was a Cyrenaic philosopher who lived in Cyrene, Libya. She was the daughter of Aristippus of Cyrene.

== Life and teachings ==
Arete learned philosophy from her father, Aristippus, who had himself learned philosophy from Socrates. Arete, in turn, taught philosophy to her son – Aristippus the Younger – who was nicknamed "Mother-taught" (Greek: μητροδίδακτος).

Arete reportedly took over the leadership of the School of Cyrene upon her father's death. She is mentioned by Diogenes Laërtius, Strabo, Aelius, Clement of Alexandria, Theodoret of Cyrus, Aristocles and in the Suda. Diogenes records that among her pupils were Theodorus the Atheist and Anniceris. While no credible historic source has survived on Arete's teachings, the tenets of the School of Cyrene which her father founded are known. It was one of the first to advance a systematic view on the role of pleasure and pain in human life. The Cyrenaics argued that discipline, knowledge, and virtuous actions are more likely to result in pleasure. Whereas negative emotions, such as anger and fear, multiplied pain. Towards the end of Plato's Protagoras it is reasoned that the "salvation of our life" depends upon applying to pleasures and pains a "science of measurement". The School of Cyrene provided one of the first approaches to hedonism, which surfaced again in 18th and 19th century Europe and was advanced by thinkers such as Jeremy Bentham.

== Historic sources ==
Among the spurious Socratic epistles (dating perhaps from the 1st century) there is a fictitious letter from Aristippus addressed to Arete.

John Augustine Zahm (writing under the pseudonym of Mozans), claimed that the 14th century scholar Giovanni Boccaccio had access to some "early Greek writers," which allowed Boccaccio to give special praise to Arete "for the breadth and variety of her attainments":

She is said to have publicly taught natural and moral philosophy in the schools and academies of Attica for thirty-five years, to have written forty books, and to have counted among her pupils one hundred and ten philosophers. She was so highly esteemed by her countrymen that they inscribed on her tomb an epitaph which declared that she was the splendour of Greece and possessed the beauty of Helen, the virtue of Thirma, the pen of Aristippus, the soul of Socrates and the tongue of Homer.
