= Cynic epistles =

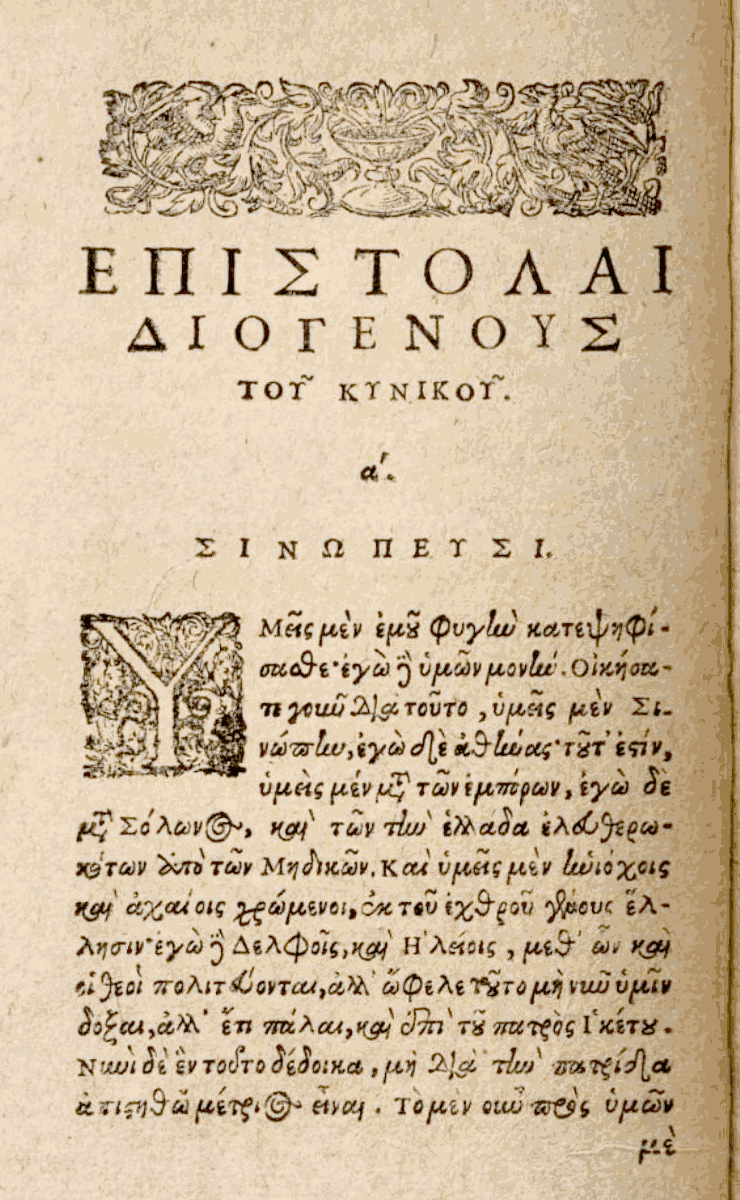
- Letter 1 from "Diogenes"
- Author: (Pseudo-) Diogenes, (Pseudo-) Crates, etc
- Language: Koine Greek
- Subject: Ethics
- Genre: Philosophy
- Publication place: Greece

The Cynic epistles are a collection of letters expounding the principles and practices of Cynic philosophy mostly written, rewritten, or translated, in the time of the Roman Empire, but purporting to have been written by much earlier philosophers.

== Letters and dating ==
The two main groups of letters are a set of 51 letters attributed to Diogenes of Sinope, and a set of 36 letters attributed to Crates of Thebes. Most of the letters of Diogenes were probably written or altered in the 1st century BCE, whereas the letters of Crates, some of which seem to be based on the Diogenes letters, probably date from the 1st century CE. It is not known who wrote the letters, but they seem to have been influenced by multiple authors. Written in Koine Greek, the Epistles are among the few Cynic writings which have survived from the time of the Roman empire.

In addition to these letters, there are 10 spurious epistles attributed to Anacharsis and 9 epistles attributed to Heraclitus. The letters of Anacharsis may have been written in the 3rd century BCE, whereas the Heraclitean letters probably date from the 1st century CE. Anacharsis and Heraclitus predate the Cynics, but they were both regarded by the Cynics to have anticipated Cynic ideals. There are also 35 Socratic epistles supposedly written by Socrates and his followers (Antisthenes, Aristippus, Aeschines, Xenophon, etc.). Many of these letters were also written by someone with a strong affinity towards Cynic ideals, albeit with a sympathy towards Aristippus rather than Antisthenes. Other fictitious letters, such as some of those attributed to Hippocrates, could also be included among the Cynic epistles.

== Content ==
The Cynic epistles deal with ethical matters rather than religious ones: their purpose is not to seek the divine, but rather to seek the ethically pure life by breaking away from social norms and conventions via ascetic practices. The content of the epistles are not especially original, but probably served as a means to propagate Cynic ideology. The letters discuss different aspects of the Cynic way of life, as part of a rigorous training (askesis). Thus instructions and explanations are given on whom (and whom not) to emulate and how different aspects of wisdom are acquired and demonstrated, mixed in with polemics directed against people who oppose these ideals. The moral anecdotes contained in the epistles are probably examples of those used by Cynic street preachers of the time. As with much Cynic thought in the time of the Roman empire, the content of the epistles show influences from Stoicism and other philosophies.

== See also ==
- Simon the Shoemaker
