= Hegesias of Cyrene =

Cyrenaic philosopher (active 290 BC)

Hegesias (Ancient Greek: Ἡγησίας; fl. 290 BC) of Cyrene was a Cyrenaic philosopher. He argued that eudaimonia (happiness) is impossible to achieve, and that the goal of life should be the avoidance of pain and sorrow. Conventional values such as wealth, poverty, freedom, and slavery are all indifferent and produce no more pleasure than pain. Cicero claims that Hegesias wrote a book called ἀποκαρτερῶν (Death by Starvation), which persuaded so many people that death is more desirable than life that Hegesias was banned from teaching in Alexandria. It has been thought by some that Hegesias was influenced by Buddhist teachings.

== Life ==
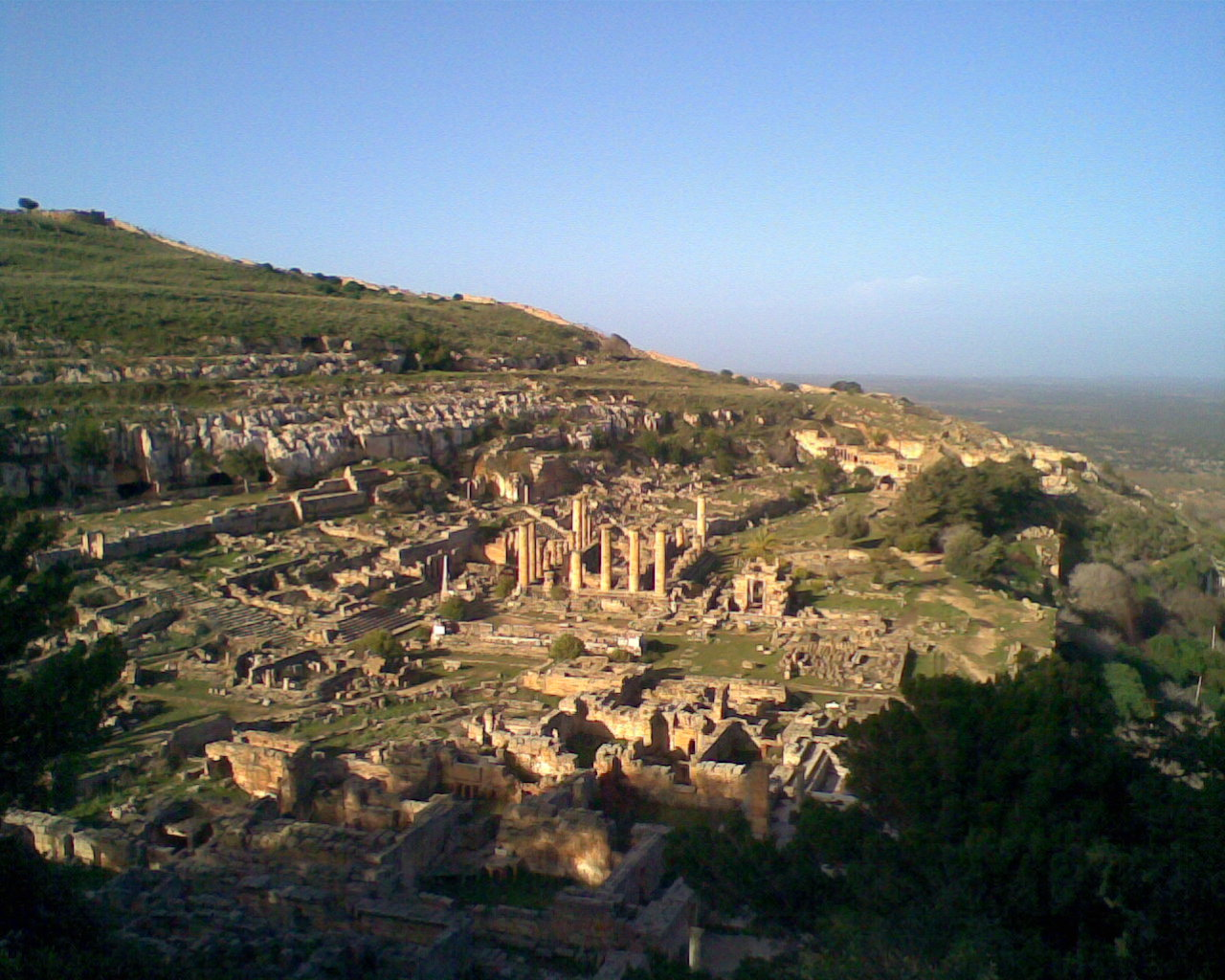
Ruins of Cyrene, in the northwest of modern Libya, where Hegesias lived.

Diogenes Laërtius describes Hegesias as the pupil of Paraebates, who was a pupil of Epitimides, who was a pupil of Antipater of Cyrene, who was a pupil of Aristippus (c. 435 – c. 360 BC). He was the fellow-student of Anniceris, but he differed from Anniceris by presenting the system which Anniceris softened and improved in its most nihilistic form.

== Philosophy ==
Hegesias followed Aristippus in considering pleasure as the goal of life; but, the view which he took of human life was more pessimistic. Because eudaimonia was unattainable, the sage's goal should be to become free from pain and sorrow. Since, too, every person is self-sufficient, all external goods were rejected as not being true sources of pleasure:

Complete happiness cannot possibly exist; for that the body is full of many sensations, and that the mind sympathizes with the body, and is troubled when that is troubled, and also that fortune prevents many things which we cherished in anticipation; so that for all these reasons, perfect happiness eludes our grasp. Moreover, that both life and death are desirable. They also say that there is nothing naturally pleasant or unpleasant, but that owing to want, or rarity, or satiety, some people are pleased and some vexed; and that wealth and poverty have no influence at all on pleasure, for that rich people are not affected by pleasure in a different manner from poor people. In the same way they say that slavery and freedom are things indifferent, if measured by the standard of pleasure, and nobility and baseness of birth, and glory and infamy. They add that, for the foolish person it is expedient to live, but to the wise person it is a matter of indifference; and that the wise person will do everything for his own sake; for that he will not consider any one else of equal importance with himself; and he will see that if he were to obtain ever such great advantages from any one else, they would not be equal to what he could himself bestow.

Hence the sage ought to regard nothing but himself; action is quite indifferent; and if action, so also is life, which, therefore, is in no way more desirable than death:

The wise person would not be so much absorbed in the pursuit of what is good, as in the attempt to avoid what is bad, considering the chief good to be living free from all trouble and pain: and that this end was attained best by those who looked upon the efficient causes of pleasure as indifferent.

As recounted by Cicero in Tusculan Disputations:

If, then, our inquiry is after truth, death withdraws us from evil, not from good. This subject is indeed so copiously handled by Hegesias, the Cyrenaic philosopher, that he is said to have been forbidden by Ptolemy from delivering his lectures in the schools, because some who heard him made away with themselves… The book I mentioned of that Hegesias is called Ἀποκαρτερῶν, or "A Man who starves himself,” in which a man is represented as killing himself by starvation, till he is prevented by his friends, in reply to whom he reckons up all the miseries of human life.

— Cicero, Tusculan Disputations, Book I

== See also ==
- Existential nihilism
- Philosophical pessimism
