= Diogenes =

4th-century BC Greek Cynic philosopher

Diogenes of Sinope
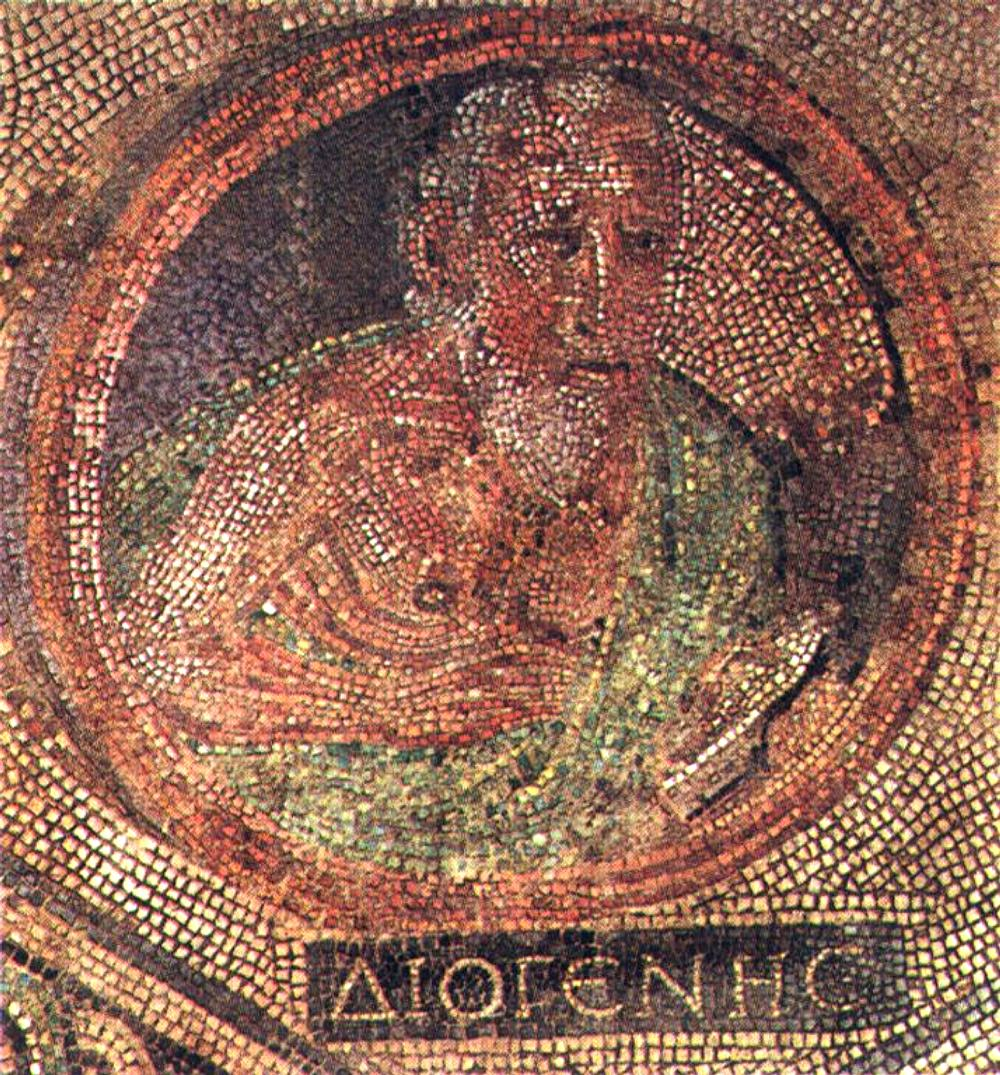
- Ancient Roman mosaic depicting Diogenes (2nd or 3rd century AD)
- Born: 413/403 BC: Sinope, Paphlagonia
- Died: 324/321 BC (aged 81 or 90); Corinth, Macedonian Empire

Philosophical work
- Era: Ancient Greek philosophy
- Region: Western philosophy
- School: Cynicism
- Notable students: Crates of Thebes and Monimus
- Notable works: Politeia
- Notable ideas: Cosmopolitanism

Diogenes the Cynic (Note: Ancient Greek: Διογένης ὁ Κυνικός, romanized: Diogénēs ho Kynikós; IPA: [di.o.ɡé.nɛːs ho ky.ni.kós]) (/daɪˈɒdʒɪniːz/, dy-OJ-in-eez; c. 413/403 – c. 324/321 BC), also known as Diogenes of Sinope, was an ancient Greek philosopher during the period of Classical Greece, and one of the founders of Cynicism.

Renowned for his ascetic lifestyle and radical critiques of social conventions, he became a legendary figure whose life and teachings have been recounted, often through anecdote, in both antiquity and modernity. Diogenes advocated a return to nature, the renunciation of wealth, and introduced early ideas of cosmopolitanism by proclaiming himself a "citizen of the world".

Diogenes was born to a prosperous family in Sinope. His life took a dramatic turn following a scandal involving the debasement of coinage, an event that led to his exile and ultimately his radical rejection of conventional values. Embracing a life of poverty and self-sufficiency, he became famous for his unconventional, shameless behaviors that openly challenged societal norms, such as living in a large ceramic jar or wandering public spaces with a lit lantern in daylight, claiming to be "looking for a man", that is to say "for a wise man" (sophos).

His memorable encounters, including that with Alexander the Great, along with various accounts of his death, have made him a lasting symbol of philosophical defiance to established authorities and artificial values.

== Biography ==
=== Early life in Sinope ===
Diogenes was born c. 413/403 BC in Sinope, a Milesian colony in Paphlagonia on the Black Sea (modern Sinop, northern Turkey). He was the son of Hicesias, a trapezitēs, that is, a money-changer authorized to exchange foreign currencies for local money. Nothing is known about his mother. As a child, Diogenes learned to read, write, and quote both epic and tragic verses, while also training in athletics and horsemanship. In his father's footsteps, he held the position of epimelētēs, a magistrate whose duties varied by city, though the specifics of his role remain unknown.

In an episode later recast as a metaphor for his philosophy, he and his father were accused of "debasing the currency". Ancient sources disagree on who was responsible: some blame Hicesias, others Diogenes, while a further tradition asserts that Diogenes committed the fraud and fled, whereas his father, who oversaw the treasury, was arrested and died in prison. Modern scholarship remains divided. Some regard this episode as a fiction inspired by Diogenes's writings and symbolic of his aim to "revalue the currency" (paracharattein to nomisma), meaning to challenge conventional values. Others argue for a historical core, citing debased Sinopean coins from 350–340 BC and later issues bearing the name Hikesio. Diogenes himself admitted his guilt in his lost treatise Pordalos, and his father's position as trapezitēs would have made the crime feasible.

A related legend recounts that, seeking guidance from Apollo's oracle at Delphi (or Delos) on how to gain renown, Diogenes was told to "adulterate the currency". Misinterpreting the phrase, he took it literally without realising its figurative sense. (Note: The Greek word nomisma is indeed ambiguous, as it can refer to both coinage and social institutions.) Another version places the oracle after his exile, explicitly tying the command to his philosophical mission. This story is likely apocryphal, perhaps a parody of Socrates's Delphic oracle, and inconsistent with Diogenes's scepticism toward religion. He himself claimed to have embraced philosophy only later in Athens. Jean-Manuel Roubineau suggests that the legend may have been devised by later authors to downplay his role in any actual fraud.

=== Exile ===
The exact date of Diogenes's departure from Sinope is uncertain. It is also unclear whether he was banished or exiled, or if he fled out of fear of the consequences.

Diogenes's exile marked a turning point and a moment of profound spiritual conversion. In his time, being separated from one's homeland, and thus denied the honour of being buried with one's ancestors, was seen as a tragic fate. Diogenes rejected this sentimental attachment, embracing exile as the ultimate detachment from worldly ties. Plutarch notes that the hardships of exile transformed him into a philosopher.

Diogenes reportedly owned a Phrygian slave named Manes. Given Diogenes's poverty after fleeing Sinope, it is more likely that Manes was part of his early life rather than a slave bought in Athens. When the slave escaped, Diogenes dismissed his ill fortune by saying, "If Manes can live without Diogenes, why not Diogenes without Manes?". This attitude reflects the Cynic belief that true freedom comes from detaching oneself from possessions and desires, so even owning a slave could be seen as a form of self-enslavement. J. Garcia Gonzalez has argued that this anecdote, like other stories about Diogenes, is symbolic rather than factual, using the names "Manes" and "Diogenes" as generic representations to convey philosophical ideas. Although evading capture, Manes died when wild dogs attacked him as he fled to Delphi.

=== Life in Athens ===
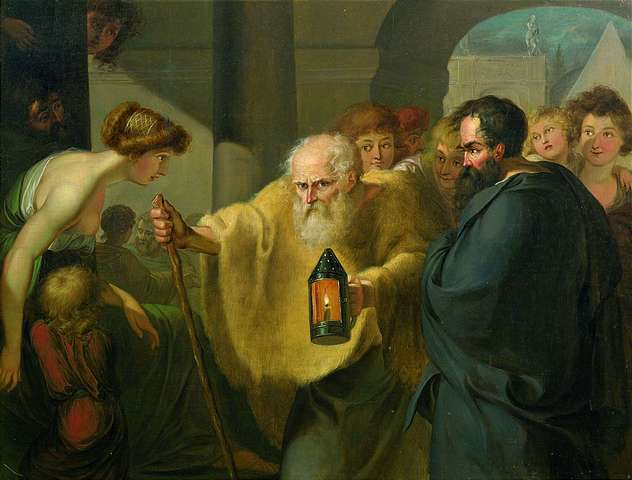
Diogenes looking for a man, attributed to J. H. W. Tischbein (c. 1780)

Diogenes spent his mild winters in Athens, surviving by begging and taking shelter in a large ceramic jar (pithos), originally meant for food storage. (Note: Later Latin interpretations, beginning with Seneca (first century AD), shifted the term from pithos to 'barrel' or 'cask', influencing modern depictions of the philosopher. However, Diogenes never lived in a barrel, as such containers did not exist in his time.) (Note: While Diogenes's jar is commonly associated with his time in Athens, some sources also mention it as his home in Corinth.) The Athenians reportedly held him in high regard, even replacing his jar when a youth broke it. He spent his summers outdoors in Corinth, cooled by breezes from the Isthmus. In the summer, Diogenes would roll in the hot sand, and in winter, he embraced frozen statues. Diogenes was also known to wander the marketplace by day with a lit lamp, saying "I am looking for a man", that is to say "for a wise man" (sophos). (Note: This is sometimes translated as looking for an "honest man", although the term "honest" only appears in modern sources, never in ancient sources.)

In his later years, he carried a walking stick when he left town, a symbol of both his itinerant lifestyle and public authority. Ancient texts report that he visited various other cities, which helped shape Diogenes's reputation as a wandering philosopher. Although he admired Sparta, he still employed his trademark method of teaching through criticism while he was there. When a Spartan cited Hesiod's verse "Nor would the ox die, if a neighbor were not evil", Diogenes retorted, "But the Messenians and their oxen have died, and you are their neighbours". Diogenes's other travels remain mysterious. His visits to various cities in Asia Minor, especially Miletus, known for its rich intellectual history, suggest he may have journeyed for philosophical reasons, though the exact details are lost to us.

=== Later life in Corinth ===
Another, probably apocryphal, story claims that, while on a voyage to Aegina, Diogenes was captured by pirates led by a man named Scirpalus or Harpalus. Taken to Crete, he was sold at a slave market to a Corinthian man named Xeniades. Noticing Xeniades among the other bidders, he turned to the auctioneer and said, "Sell me to him; he needs a master". Diogenes was asked to oversee the education of his sons and to manage the affairs of his household. After his master freed him, it is reported that he stayed in Corinth, living alone near a gymnasium called 'the Craneum' on the outskirts of the city, nestled in a cypress grove overlooking the harbour.

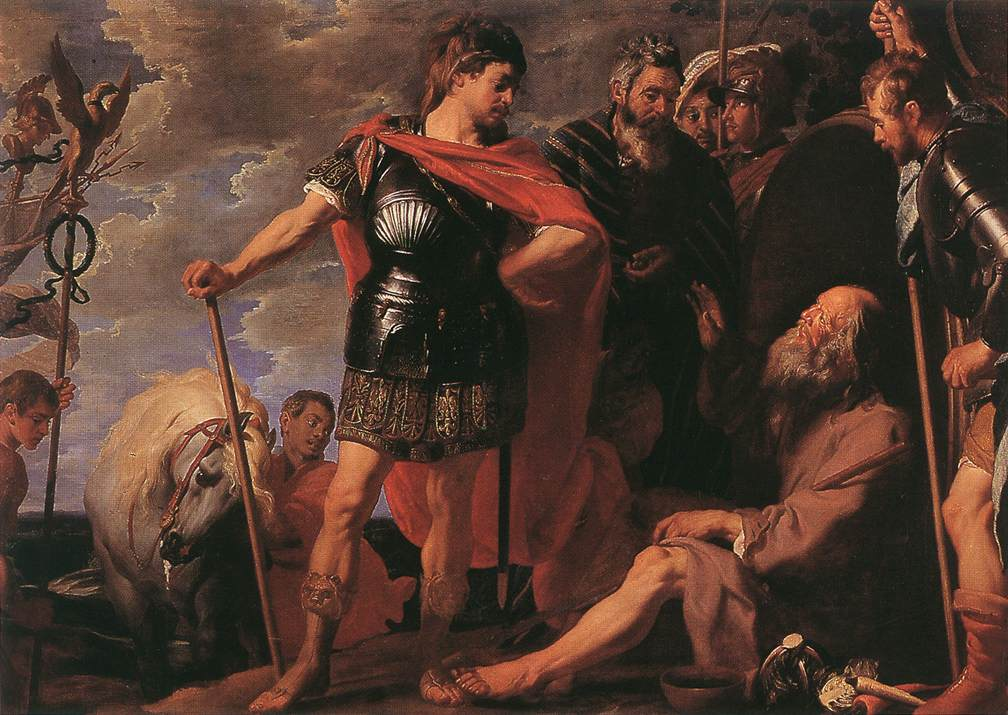
Alexander and Diogenes, by Gaspar de Crayer (c. 1630)

According to Dionysius the Stoic, Diogenes was taken prisoner in 338 by Philip II of Macedon during the Battle of Chaeronea, in northern Boeotia. Amused by his audacity, Philip decided to release him. In July 336, Diogenes attended the 111th Olympic Games. When a herald announced, "Dioxippus has defeated the other men", he retorted, "On the contrary! He defeats slaves, while I defeat men". When asked if he had come to watch the competitions, Diogenes replied that he was there to take part in them, to combat human ills: anger, mistrust, sadness, desire, and fear. At the Isthmian Games, he even crowned himself victor by placing a pine wreath on his head, an act that prompted the Corinthians to try to remove it.

According to tradition, he met Philip's son Alexander the Great, likely in 336 when Alexander was proclaimed commander of the expedition against Persia at the Isthmus of Corinth. As Plutarch recounts, when Alexander arrived, Diogenes refused to join the formal greeting and instead stayed in his usual spot in a cypress grove outside Corinth. Alexander engaged him in a conversation that later became famous.

At the approach of so many people, Diogenes sat up a little and fixed his eyes on Alexander. When the king greeted him and asked if there was anything he wanted, Diogenes replied, "Yes, that you should stand a little out of my sun". It is said that Alexander was so impressed by this—and by the arrogance and grandeur of spirit of a man who could treat him with such disdain—that he said to his courtiers, who were laughing and joking about the philosopher as they walked away, "But I'll tell you this: if I were not Alexander, I would be Diogenes!"

— Plutarch, Alexander, XIV

=== Death ===
Some sources claim that Diogenes died on the same night as Alexander the Great (June 10–11, 323 BC), but this is likely legend. Modern scholars believe that he died in the late 320s, probably around 324/321 BC. Censorinus writes that Diogenes died at the age of 81, while Laertius holds that he lived to be about 90. The exact location of Diogenes's death remains disputed. Some accounts claim he died in Corinth, either in the Craneion or at his former master's house, while others suggest he died in Athens, or even near Olympia. Additionally, ancient sources offer various explanations for his death. Some, like Cercidas and Antisthenes of Rhodes, assert that he committed suicide by self-asphyxiation, a method symbolically reflecting his commitment to self-determination. Other accounts attribute his demise to eating a raw octopus in an attempt to demonstrate the uselessness of cooking (Athenaeus), to a fever contracted on the eve of his departure for the Olympic games (Epictetus and Jerome), or to an infected dog bite while trying to divide an octopus among some dogs (Diogenes Laertius).

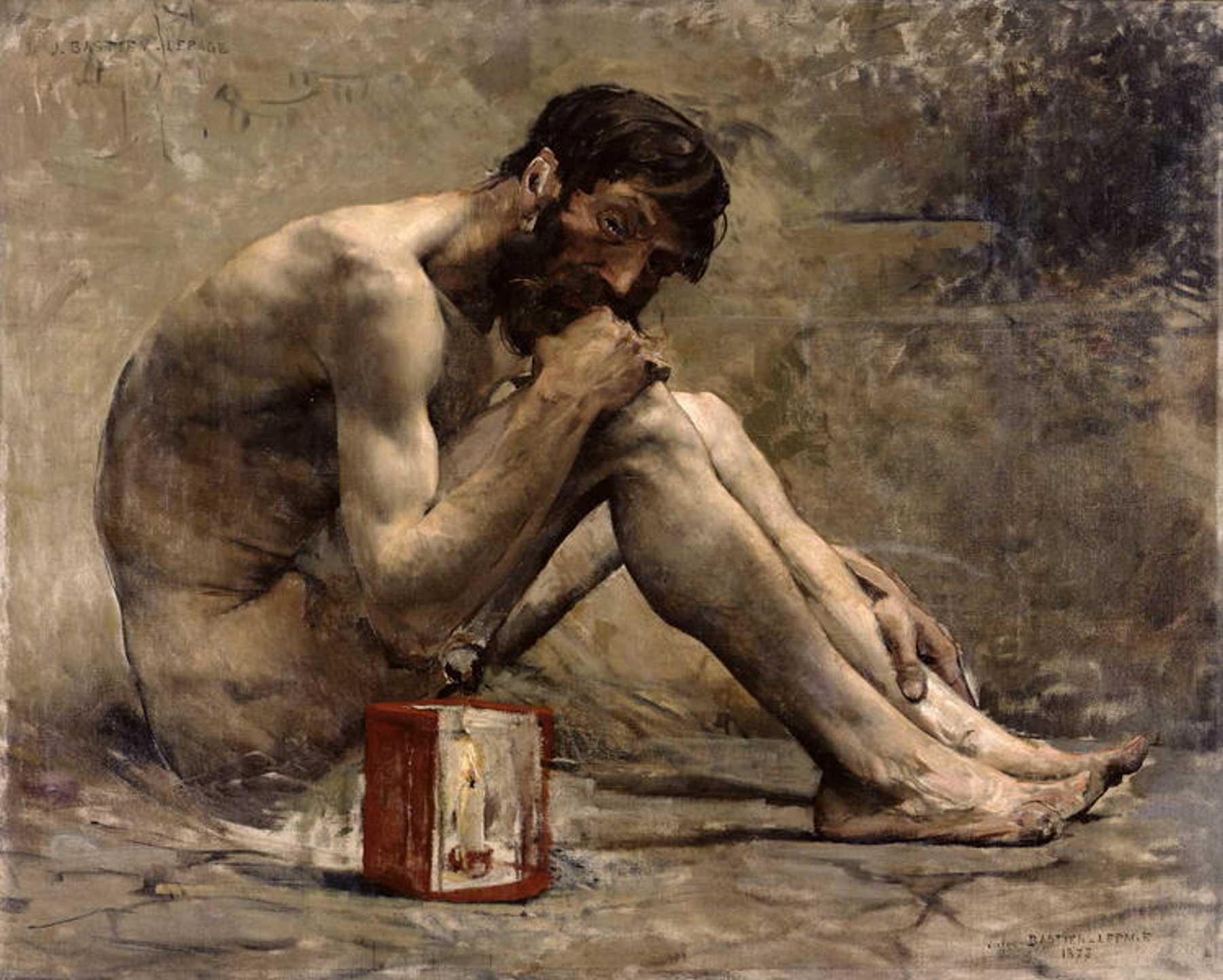
Diogenes, by Jules Bastien-Lepage (1873)

Diogenes showed little concern for his burial, instructing that his body be discarded, either left unburied outside the city wall for wild animals, thrown into a ditch and covered with dust, or even dumped into the river Ilisos. Diogenes's followers ended up in a violent dispute over how and who should manage his burial, an anecdote that seems to convey they had not fully embraced his lesson of indifference to human customs. Ultimately, the Corinthians arranged a funeral, and he was buried outside the city walls near the western gate, close to where he spent his final years. Eubulus, on the other hand, reports that Diogenes was buried by the children of Xeniades, for whom he had served as a tutor. Pausanias, writing in the 2nd century AD, noted that Diogenes's tomb was among those visible near Corinth.

As a genuine Cynic, he would insist without ambivalence that his body should just be thrown away without burial. His associates would ask him, "But could it be that you wish that your body be the food of vultures and wild beasts?" "Not at all", he would reply, "as long as you provide me with a stick to chase those creatures away!" "But, then", they would say, "how could you do that, if you will not be aware of anything?" "Ah yes! If in death I cannot be aware of anything, how could the bites of wild creatures hurt me?"

— Cicero, Tusc. disp., I, XIII

In ancient Greece and Rome, a philosopher's death was often seen as a final statement on their teachings. Diogenes's death, with its imaginative and varied accounts, became as controversial as his indifference to his own burial. His perspective, as summarised by Teles, was shared by all the Cynics who followed him: "What difference is there between being consumed by fire, devoured by a dog, left above ground to be preyed upon by vultures, or buried below ground to be eaten by worms?"

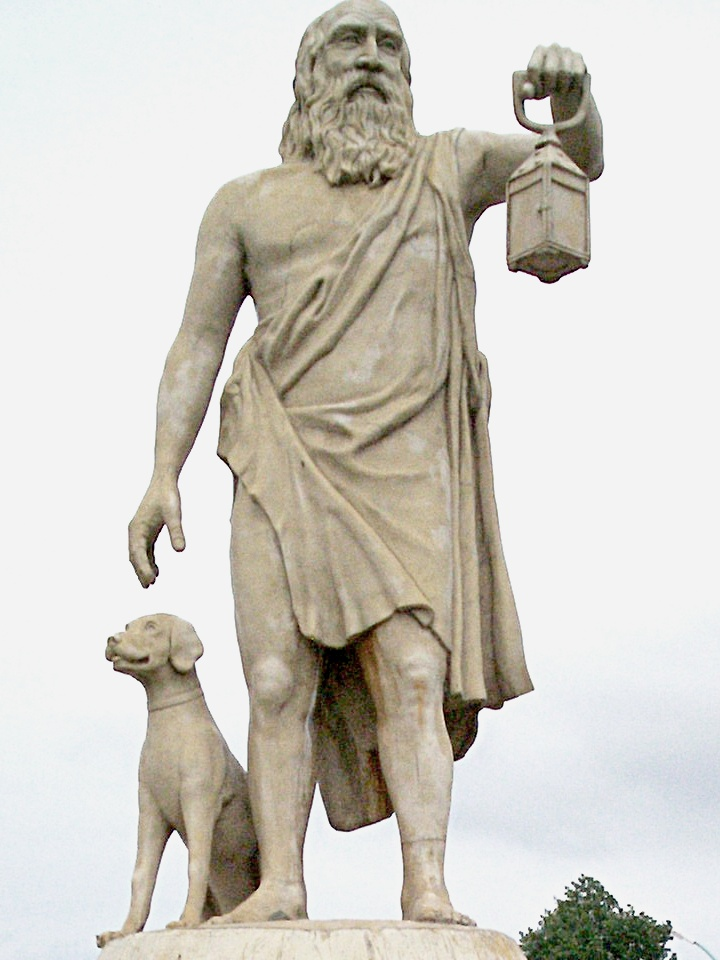
Modern day statue of Diogenes

According to Roubineau, given the tomb at Corinth and the account of his death in the Craneion, it seems likely that Diogenes died in or near Corinth. The more dramatic accounts, such as dying from eating an octopus, a dispute with a dog, or self-asphyxiation, appear to be philosophical fictions, and the most plausible explanation is that he died of old age.

A bronze statue of Diogenes was erected in Sinope after his death, with the following poem from Philiscus of Aegina at its base.

Even bronze is aged by time, but not all the ages, Diogenes, will destroy your fame, since you alone showed mortals the rule of self-sufficiency and the easiest path through life.

— Philiscus of Aegina

== Philosophy ==
=== Influences ===
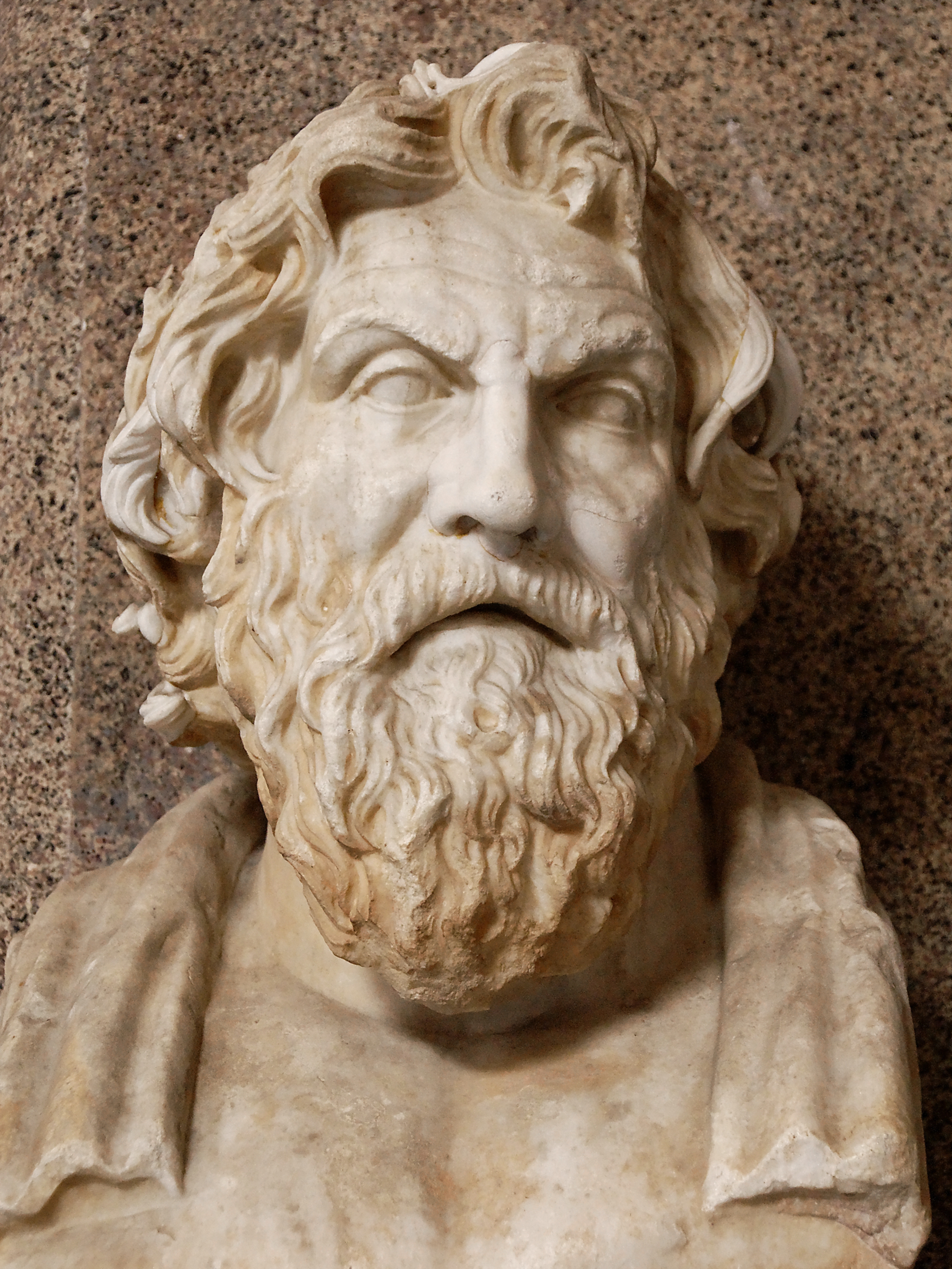
Antisthenes

Laërtius states that Diogenes became a disciple of the original cynic philosopher Antisthenes (c. 446 – c. 366 BC), himself a student of Socrates (c. 470 – c. 399 BC). Although the timeline raises some doubts about his attending Antisthenes' school at the Cynosarges, (Note: Some modern scholars argue that Diogenes may have learned about Antisthenes's philosophy only from his writings. Susan H. Prince suggests that he may have arrived in Athens sometime between the 360s and 345 BC, whereas H. Bannert contends that his arrival occurred in the years 370–365. To reconcile those views, some have proposed that he had visited Athens and Antisthenes before his exile, and returned to Sinope.) Diogenes clearly adopted many of Antisthenes's ideas. These include emphasizing virtue over societal laws and customs, religious scepticism, and prioritizing deeds over abstract ideas.

Emulating Socrates, Diogenes publicly questioned those who claimed to possess wisdom and preferred to engage people in their everyday lives rather than teaching in formal educational settings, as other philosophers did. While he shared Socrates's goal of converting others to philosophy, his methods were far more abrasive. Socrates called himself a gadfly; Diogenes called himself a dog. Diogenes' methods led his contemporary Plato (c. 427 - c. 348 BC) to call him "Socrates gone mad". When Plato defined man as a "featherless biped", Diogenes "plucked the feathers from a cock, brought it to Plato's school, and said, 'Here is Plato's man.'" Plato subsequently amended the definition to include "broad, flat nails". When a follower of the Eleatic Zeno argued motion was impossible, Diogenes simply got up and left. Upon seeing an incompetent archer, he sat down beside the target so as to get out of harm's way.

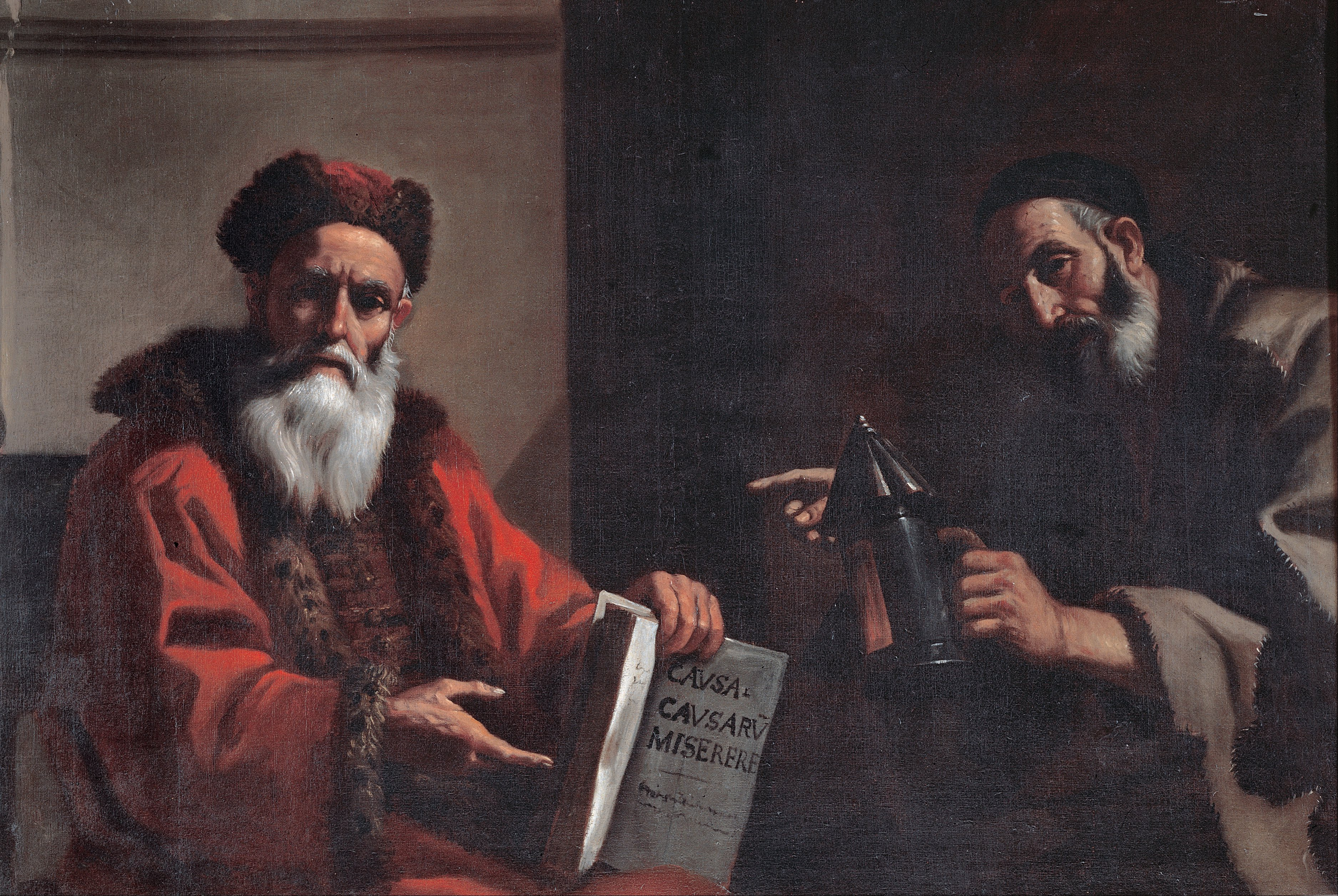
Plato and Diogenes, by Mattia Preti (c. 1688)

Diogenes' philosophy was shaped by his status as an exile. In Cynic thought, noble exiles like Odysseus and especially Heracles, about whom Diogenes wrote tragedies, served as models of exemplary behavior. The solitary Heraclitus was also an influence on the Cynics. Heraclitus said most people live as if in a deep state of sleep, which resembles the Cynic belief of a cloud of mist or fog shrouding all of existence, an unsubstantial typhos which must be met with indifference.

=== Challenging social norms ===
Diogenes advocated a shameless life lived according to nature rather than ruled by social convention or nomos. He openly engaged in behaviors that defied social norms, such as masturbating and spitting in public, eating in the marketplace, and even urinating on people. What appears at first to be mere deviant actions has been interpreted as a means of teaching virtue and an investigation into what is natural and what is conventional. It has also been suggested he did this to drive publicity towards his philosophical sect.

Diogenes's attitude towards the rich has given the word "cynicism" its modern meaning of a sneering disbelief in others' virtue. It was said Diogenes would spit in the face of a rich man, having nowhere else to spit in his house.

=== Cosmopolitanism ===
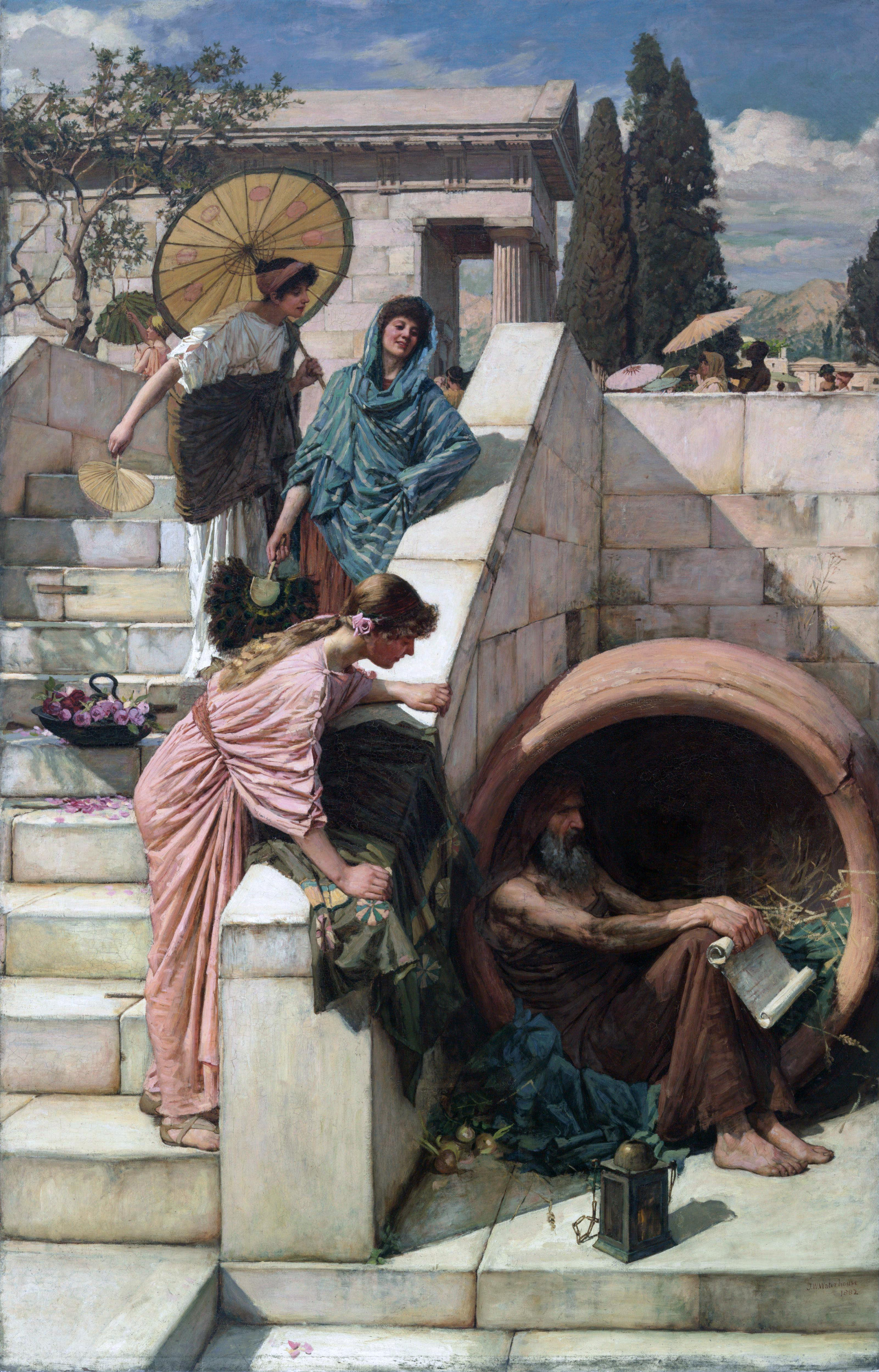
Diogenes, by John William Waterhouse (1882)

Diogenes invented an early form of cosmopolitanism, and probably the term itself. When asked about his origin, he responded with a single word: kosmopolitēs ("I am a citizen of the world"). Diogenes maintained that "the only true commonwealth was that which was commensurate with the universe".

Lucian quotes him as saying:

Let the whole world be a bed large enough for me, let me call the universe my home.

His philosophical outlook was likely shaped by his early years in Sinope and his subsequent exile. Encounters with non-Greek peoples along the Black Sea probably contributed to his development of cultural relativism. Favorinus argued that cosmopolitanism served as both a response to and a consolation for the loss of one's homeland, and Diogenes's experience as a foreigner may have challenged the notion that political power naturally belongs to those born by accident in a particular city.

However, the continuity between ancient and modern cosmopolitanism must not be exaggerated. While Diogenes promoted the idea of being a "citizen of the world", he and his followers did not advocate for a universal brotherhood. Instead, his focus was on revealing that the city-state is an artificial construct rather than a natural state of affairs.

=== Asceticism ===
Diogenes practiced asceticism and minimalism. Diogenes lived in a jar (pithos), and survived by begging. He went barefoot and folded his tunic to double as bedding. When Aristippus asked Diogenes what benefit he derived from philosophy, Diogenes replied: "The ability to be rich without having a single obol". Following Socrates, Antisthenes, and Xenophon, Diogenes made a distinction between actual poverty (being economically poor) and the feeling of poverty (suffering from chronic dissatisfaction due to unmet social expectations). In his view, even Greek tyrants could be considered "poor" if they constantly felt unable to meet the financial obligations of their social class.

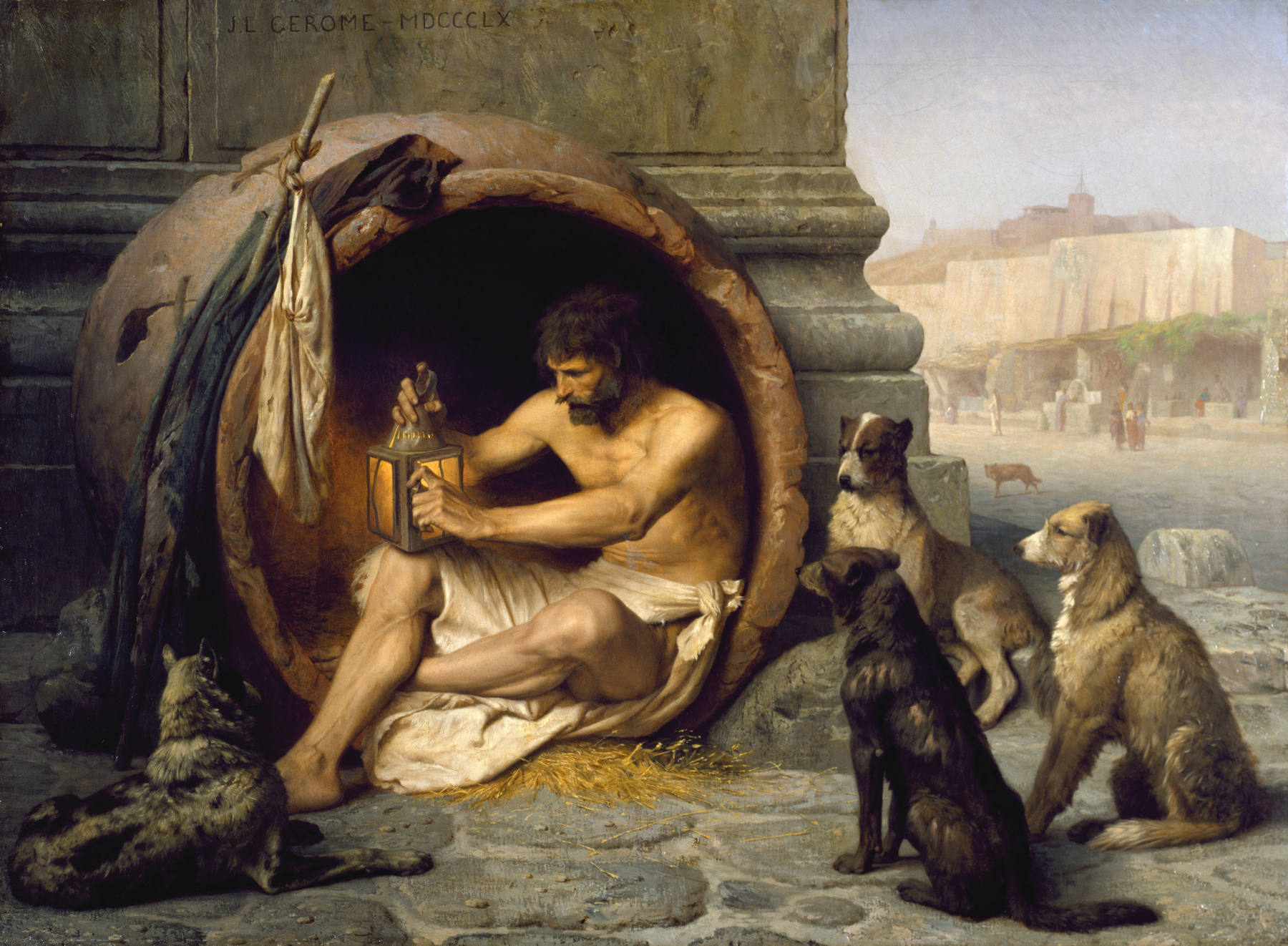
Diogènes, by Jean-Léon Gérôme (1860)

Diogenes supported himself by begging, which he saw as fair compensation for his role in challenging society's values. Diogenes once said he was a cynic or dog-like because he "fawns upon those who give him anything and barks at those who give him nothing." It remains unclear whether Diogenes became a beggar before embracing philosophy or if he deliberately rejected working as a philosophical choice, though some credit Antisthenes with this influence. Plutarch records Diogenes's remark: "In rags [Antisthenes] clothed me and condemned me to poverty and cast me out of my home".

One day, he famously discarded his drinking cup after watching a boy drink water from the hollow of his hands, saying that he was not aware until that moment that "nature had already provided him with a cup." Another anecdote claims that a chance encounter with a mouse revealed to him the value of a simple life, since the rodent is capable of adapting itself to any circumstance.

In 2005, a European Union program aimed at reducing obesity was named DIOGENES, an acronym for Diet, Obesity, and Genes, referencing Diogenes's longstanding association with frugality.

=== Autarky ===
The Cynics practiced self-sufficiency as well as poverty. Diogenes' life and thought were marked by radical self-sufficiency, courage through passivity to fate, and a rational indifference to suffering. Diogenes authored a treatise called On Wealth. Although the original work has been lost, scholars have partially reconstructed its contents from various aphorisms attributed to him. In one anecdote, he criticizes a spendthrift for squandering his inheritance, suggesting that careful habits would have prevented his poverty. In another story, he compares good civic administration to well-managed household affairs, arguing that both require thoughtful, intelligent oversight rather than mere show, reflecting his broader ideas on redefining wealth and the value of intellectual management over manual labor.

== Legacy ==
=== Reception ===
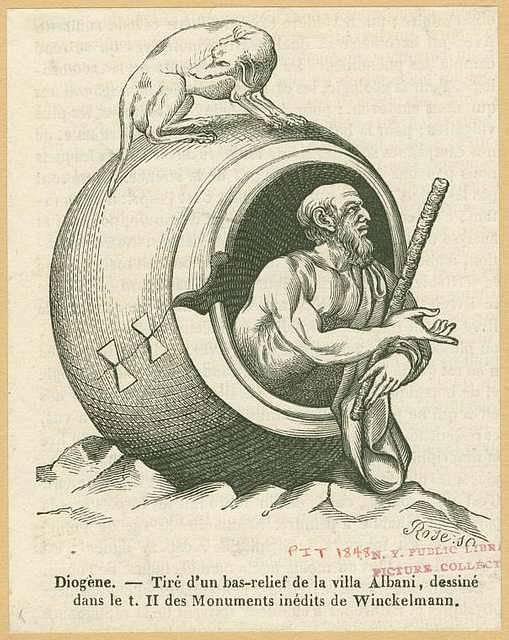
1848 drawing based on a relief from the first century AD found at Monte Testaccio

The Cynic Monimus was the slave of a Corinthian money-changer who heard tales about Diogenes from Diogenes' master Xeniades. In order that he might become the pupil of Diogenes, Monimus feigned madness by throwing money around until his master discarded him.

After Diogenes's death, classical Cynicism diverged into two main paths. One branch, founded by Zeno of Citium (c. 334 – c. 262 BC), evolved into Stoicism. This school embraced Diogenes's (and indirectly Socrates's) belief in living according to nature and reason, with virtue as the sole basis for happiness and external factors such as one's origin and social status regarded as irrelevant. The other stream, beginning with Crates of Thebes (c. 365 – c. 285 BC) and ending with Sallustius of Emesa (5th century AD), consisted of a succession of Cynics who preserved many of Diogenes's original principles and practices.

In ancient times, Cynicism was frequently overlooked in philosophical histories, with Diogenes often dismissed as a harmless eccentric. In the second century BC, Hippobotus omitted Cynicism from his list of philosophical schools, but Diogenes Laertius (3rd century AD) later argued that Cynicism was a legitimate school of philosophy, not merely a lifestyle. Often misunderstood, Cynicism was not a set of doctrines and did not pretend to the status of a philosophical formal system. It was a practical philosophy of action meant to be immediately accessible to everyone, and its adherents lived out their beliefs rather than remaining detached scholars. Besides being criticised for their lack of theoretical sophistication, Diogenes and his followers were also condemned for their perceived immorality. Critics like Cicero argued that their shameless behaviour undermined traditional moral values.

=== Depiction in art ===
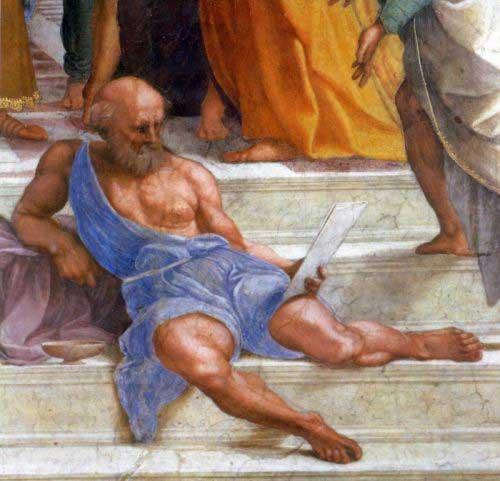
Diogenes in Raphael's The School of Athens (1509–1511)

A damaged marble bas relief from the first century AD depicting Diogenes in a jar with a dog was discovered in 1726 during excavations at Monte Testaccio, near Rome. The fragment, part of a larger image of the legendary meeting between Diogenes and Alexander, was restored in the 18th century based on a medieval drawing, adding the figure of Alexander and a new head for Diogenes derived from a statue in the Villa Albani.

Diogenes has long inspired Western art since the Renaissance. He is portrayed next to Aristotle in a fresco from 1475 by Davide Ghirlandaio. In Raphael's The School of Athens (1509–1511), Diogenes is depicted sprawled on the steps, his disheveled, weathered cloak covering only part of his body, utterly indifferent to the renowned philosophers gathered around him, especially Plato and Aristotle, who loom above him on the top step.

Jean-Léon Gérôme's Diogènes (1860) depicts the philosopher seated at the mouth of his jar, adjusting his lamp while four dogs observed him. John William Waterhouse's Diogenes (1882) depicts him inside his jar, holding a scroll with a lamp nearby, as three elegant young women look on.

In 2006, a statue by Turan Baş was erected in the modern Turkish city of Sinop. It features Diogenes standing on a barrel, holding a lamp, with a dog by his side.

=== Literature ===
The fictional Diogenes Club, named after the philosopher, appears in Sir Arthur Conan Doyle's story "The Greek Interpreter" as the club to which Sherlock Holmes's brother, Mycroft, belongs. Its name reflects the fact that its members are well-educated yet notably quiet and unsociable—much like the philosopher himself.

=== Biology ===
The Diogenidae family and Diogenes genus of hermit crabs have been named in reference to Diogenes's jar.

=== Psychology ===
From the 20th century onward, Diogenes's name has come to be applied to Diogenes syndrome, a behavioural disorder characterised by severe self-neglect, domestic squalor, social withdrawal, poor personal hygiene, excessive hoarding, and domestic uncleanliness. The eponym is generally considered a misnomer as Diogenes deliberately rejected common standards of material comfort, actively sought human company by venturing daily to the Agora, and was a minimalist.

== Works ==
According to Laertius, Diogenes wrote dialogues, letters, and tragedies, though none of these works have survived. His writings may have served as sources for the many anecdotes about him, which vary in reliability and often leave their meanings open to interpretation.

Diogenes is believed to have written a work called Politeia ('Republic'), known mainly through the accounts of Laertius and Philodemus. In this text, he presented controversial views on family, sexuality, and social and political practices that were considered so scandalous that some contemporary Stoics dismissed the work as inauthentic. Another work, Pordalos, appears to contain autobiographical elements, while the dialogue Ichthyas was addressed to a disciple of Euclid who shared the same name. At the time of Athenaeus (late 2nd–early 3rd century AD) Diogenes' Cephalion was still a well-known work. Finally, debate continues as to whether the chreiai were written by Diogenes himself or if they are accounts about him composed by others, such as Metrocles.

Diogenes's tragedies explored major mythological narratives, featuring characters such as Helen, Thyestes (which allowed him to address the subject of anthropophagy), Heracles (the quintessential cynical hero celebrated for his endurance in adversity), Achilles, Medea (whose magical feats were interpreted allegorically), Chrysippus (the son of Pelops), and Oedipus (whose acts of parricide and incest did not shock him). These plays continued to be read into later centuries, reaching figures such as Clement of Alexandria in the first century AD and Emperor Julian in the 4th century AD. Some ancient thinkers, and even some Cynics, held a low opinion of these tragedies. Stoics criticised them for addressing highly sensitive topics such as cannibalism, incest, and parricide in an immoral way. Emperor Julian even doubted their authorship, asking, "What reader of these would not abhor them and find in them an excess of infamy not to be surpassed even by courtesans?" Consequently, these tragedies were frequently attributed to one of Diogenes's disciples, such as Philiscus of Aegina or Pasiphon.

A collection of pseudepigraphic letters ascribed to Diogenes circulated between the 3rd century BC and the first century AD and was often treated as genuine. It is no longer extant. The surviving collection of pseudepigraphic letters of Diogenes among the Cynic epistles is of a later date.
