= Antipater of Cyrene =

Disciple of Aristippus

Antipater of Cyrene (Ancient Greek: Ἀντίπατρος; fl. 4th-century BC) was one of the disciples of the philosopher Aristippus, the founder of the Cyrenaic school of philosophy in Cyrene, Libya. He had a pupil called Epitimedes of Cyrene. According to Cicero, he was blind, and when some women bewailed the fact, he replied, "What do you mean? Do you think the night can furnish no pleasure?"

== See also ==
- Arete of Cyrene
- List of ancient Greek philosophers
- List of blind people
