= Theodorus the Atheist =

Ancient Greek philosopher

Theodorus the Atheist (Ancient Greek: Θεόδωρος ὁ ἄθεος, romanized: Theódōros ho átheos; c. 340 – c. 250 BCE), of Cyrene, was a Greek philosopher of the Cyrenaic school. He lived in both Greece and Alexandria, before ending his days in his native city of Cyrene. As a Cyrenaic philosopher, he taught that the goal of life was to obtain joy and avoid grief, and that the former resulted from knowledge, and the latter from ignorance. However, his principal claim to fame was his alleged atheism. He was usually designated by ancient writers ho atheos (ὁ ἄθεος), "the atheist".

== Life ==
Theodorus was a disciple of Aristippus the Younger, grandson of the elder and more famous Aristippus. He heard the lectures of a number of philosophers beside Aristippus; such as Anniceris, and Dionysius the dialectician, Zeno of Citium, and Pyrrho.

He was banished from Cyrene, but for what reason is not stated; and it is from the saying recorded of him on this occasion, "Men of Cyrene, you do ill in banishing me from Libya to Greece", as well as from his being a disciple of Aristippus, that it is inferred that he was a native of Cyrene.

Of his subsequent history there is no connected account; but the anecdotes of him show that he was at Athens, where he narrowly escaped a trial, perhaps for impiety. The influence, however, of Demetrius Phalereus reportedly shielded him; and this incident may therefore probably be placed during Demetrius' ten years of administration at Athens, 317–307 BCE. As Theodorus was banished from Athens, and was afterwards in the service of Ptolemy in Egypt, it is not unlikely that he shared the overthrow and exile of Demetrius. The account of Amphicrates of Athens cited by Diogenes Laërtius, that he was condemned to drink hemlock and so died, is doubtless an error.

While in the service of Ptolemy, Theodorus was sent on an embassy to Lysimachus, whom he offended by the freedom of his remarks. One answer which he made to a threat of crucifixion which Lysimachus had used, was celebrated by many ancient writers (Cicero, Seneca, etc.): "Employ such threats to those courtiers of yours; for it matters not to Theodorus whether he rots on the ground or in the air." From the court or camp of Lysimachus he returned apparently to that of Ptolemy. We read also of his going to Corinth with a number of his disciples: but this was perhaps only a transient visit during his residence at Athens.

He returned at length to Cyrene, and lived there, says Diogenes Laërtius, with Magas, the stepson of Ptolemy, who ruled Cyrene for fifty years (c. 300–250 BCE) as viceroy and then as king. Theodorus probably ended his days at Cyrene. Various characteristic anecdotes of Theodorus are preserved (Laërtius,. Plutarch, Valerius Maximus, Philo, etc.), from which he appears to have been a man of keen and ready wit.

== Philosophy ==
Theodorus was the founder of a sect which was called after him Theodoreioi (Θεοδώρειοι), "Theodoreans". The opinions of Theodorus, according to Diogenes Laërtius, were of the Cyrenaic school. He taught that the great end of human life is to obtain joy and avoid grief, and that the former resulted from knowledge, and the latter from ignorance. He defined the good as prudence and justice, and the bad as the opposite. Pleasure and pain, however, were indifferent. He made light of friendship and patriotism, and asserted that the world was his country. He taught that there was nothing naturally disgraceful in theft, adultery, or sacrilege if one ignored public opinion, which had been formed by the consent of fools.

Theodorus was attacked for atheism. "He did away with all opinions respecting the Gods," says Laërtius, but some critics doubt whether he was absolutely an atheist, or simply denied the existence of the deities of popular belief. The charge of atheism is sustained by the popular designation of Atheus, by the authority of Cicero, Laërtius, Pseudo-Plutarch, Sextus Empiricus, and some Christian writers; while some others (e.g. Clement of Alexandria) speak of him as only rejecting the popular theology.

Theodorus wrote a book called On the Gods (Περὶ Θεῶν). Laërtius had seen it, and said that it was not to be dismissed, adding that it was said to have been the source of many of the statements or arguments of Epicurus. According to the Suda, he wrote many works both on the doctrines of his sect and on other subjects.

His works have not been preserved.

== Contra Hipparchia ==
According to the Suda, Hipparchia of Maroneia wrote many letters addressed to Theodorus. Although none of them survives, there are anecdotes of her encounters with Theodorus:

When she went into a symposium with Crates, she tested Theodorus the Atheist by proposing a sophism like this: "That which if Theodorus did, he would not be said to do wrong, neither should Hipparchia be said to do wrong if she does it. Theodorus hitting himself does not do wrong, nor does Hipparchia do wrong hitting Theodorus." He did not reply to what she said, but pulled up her garment.

Hipparchia was neither offended nor ashamed by this "as most women would have been". We are also told that when Theodorus, quoting a line from The Bacchae of Euripides, said to her: "Who is the woman who has left behind the shuttles of the loom?" she replied

I, Theodorus, am that person, but do I appear to you to have come to a wrong decision, if I devote that time to philosophy, which I otherwise should have spent at the loom?

== See also ==
- Diagoras of Melos
