= Remarque (crater) =

Crater on Mercury

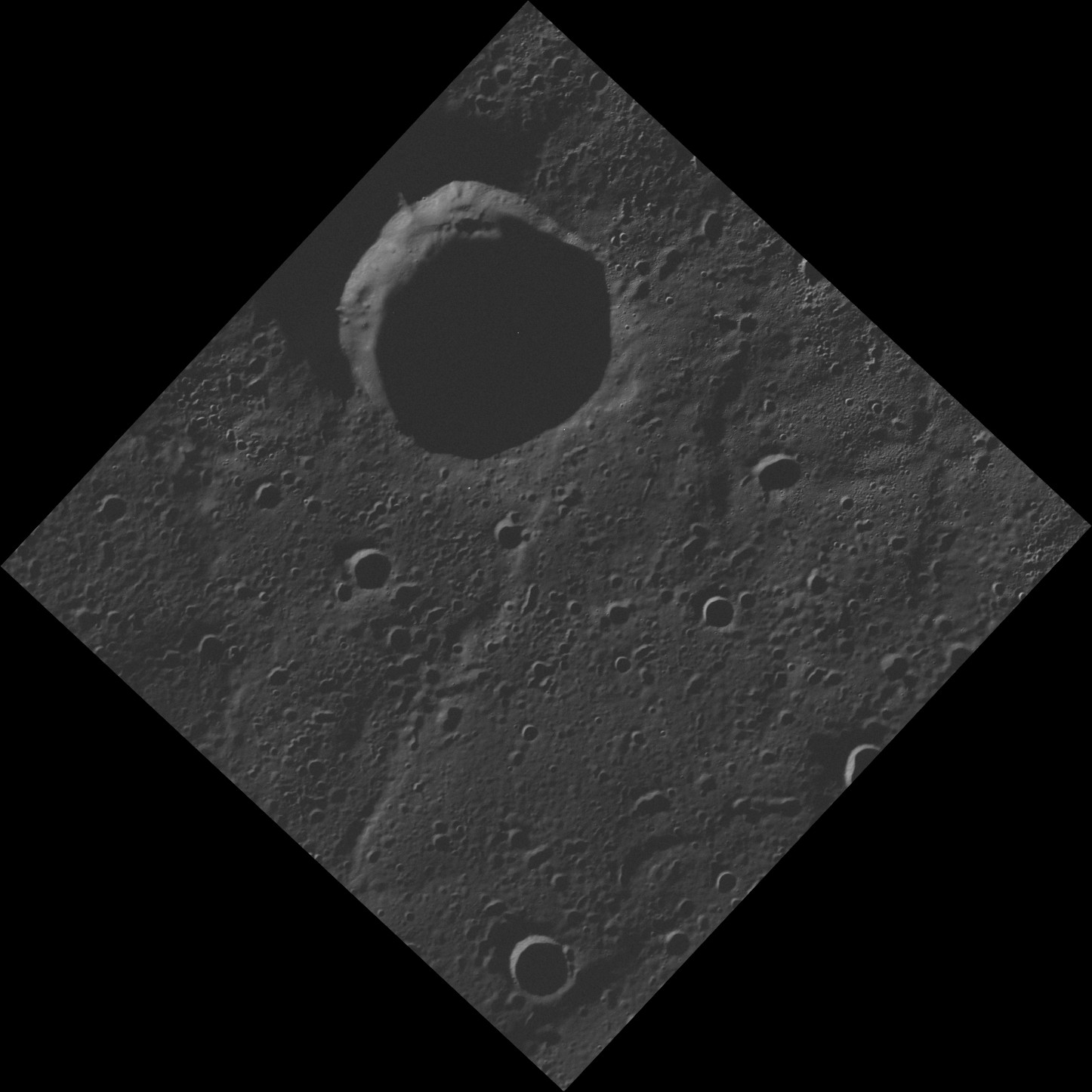
- MESSENGER WAC
- Planet: Mercury
- Coordinates: 84.94°N 6.46°W
- Quadrangle: Borealis
- Diameter: 25.9 km (16.1 mi)
- Eponym: Erich Maria Remarque

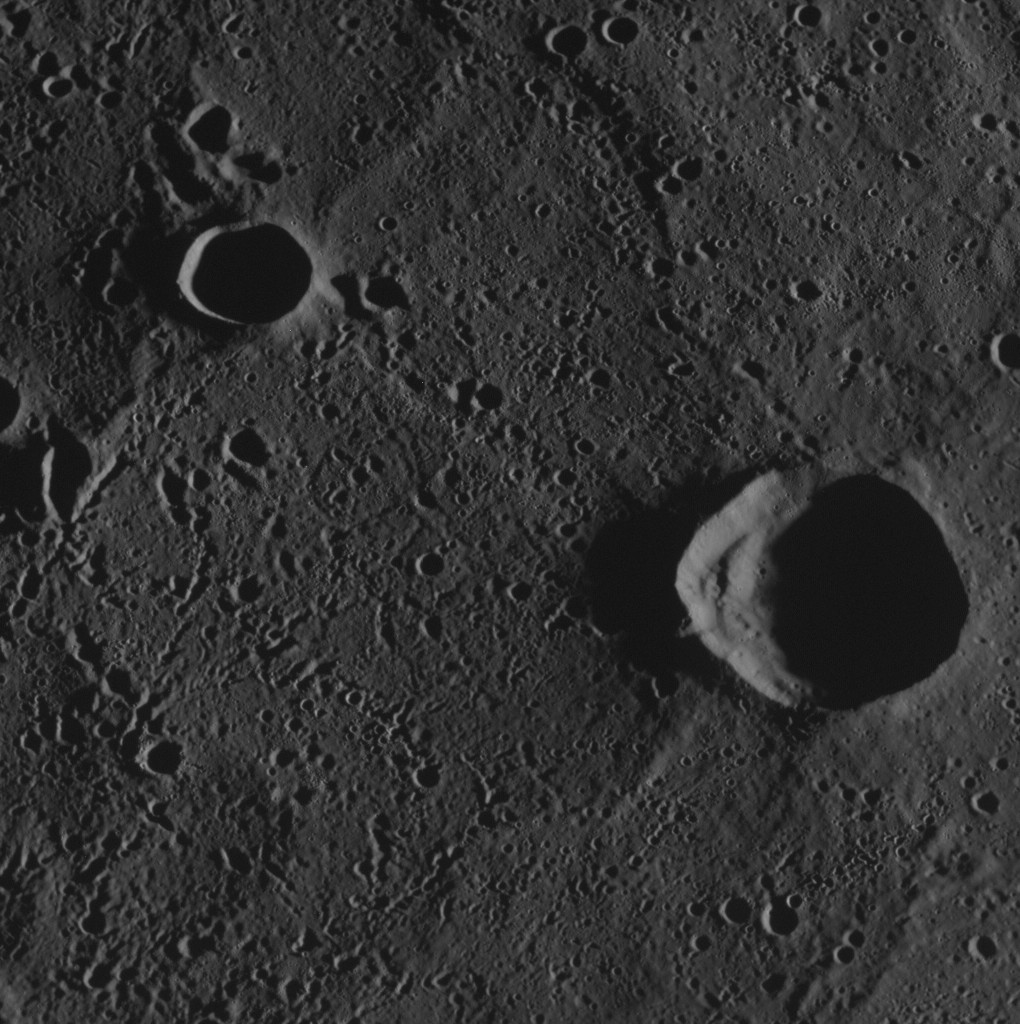
Oblique view with north at left

Remarque is a crater on Mercury. Its name was adopted by the International Astronomical Union (IAU) on December 16, 2013. Remarque is named for the German author Erich Maria Remarque.

Remarque has a region of permanent shadow on much of its floor, which has a bright radar signature. This is interpreted to represent a deposit of water ice.

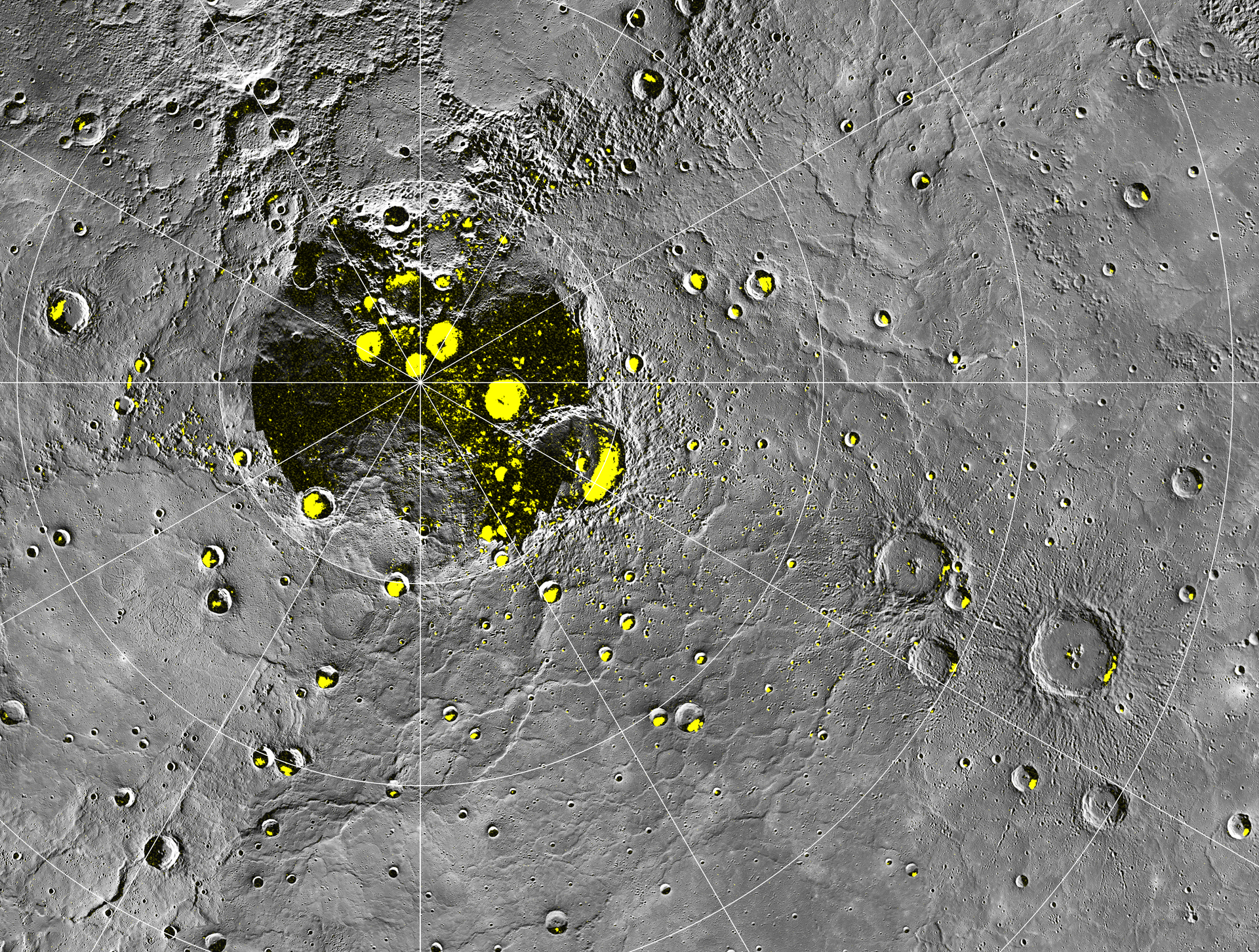
Radar-bright deposits near the north pole. Remarque is left of center.

Remarque is on the Borealis Planitia and is located northeast of the ghost crater Aristoxenus.
