= Diogenes (painting) =

1882 painting by John William Waterhouse

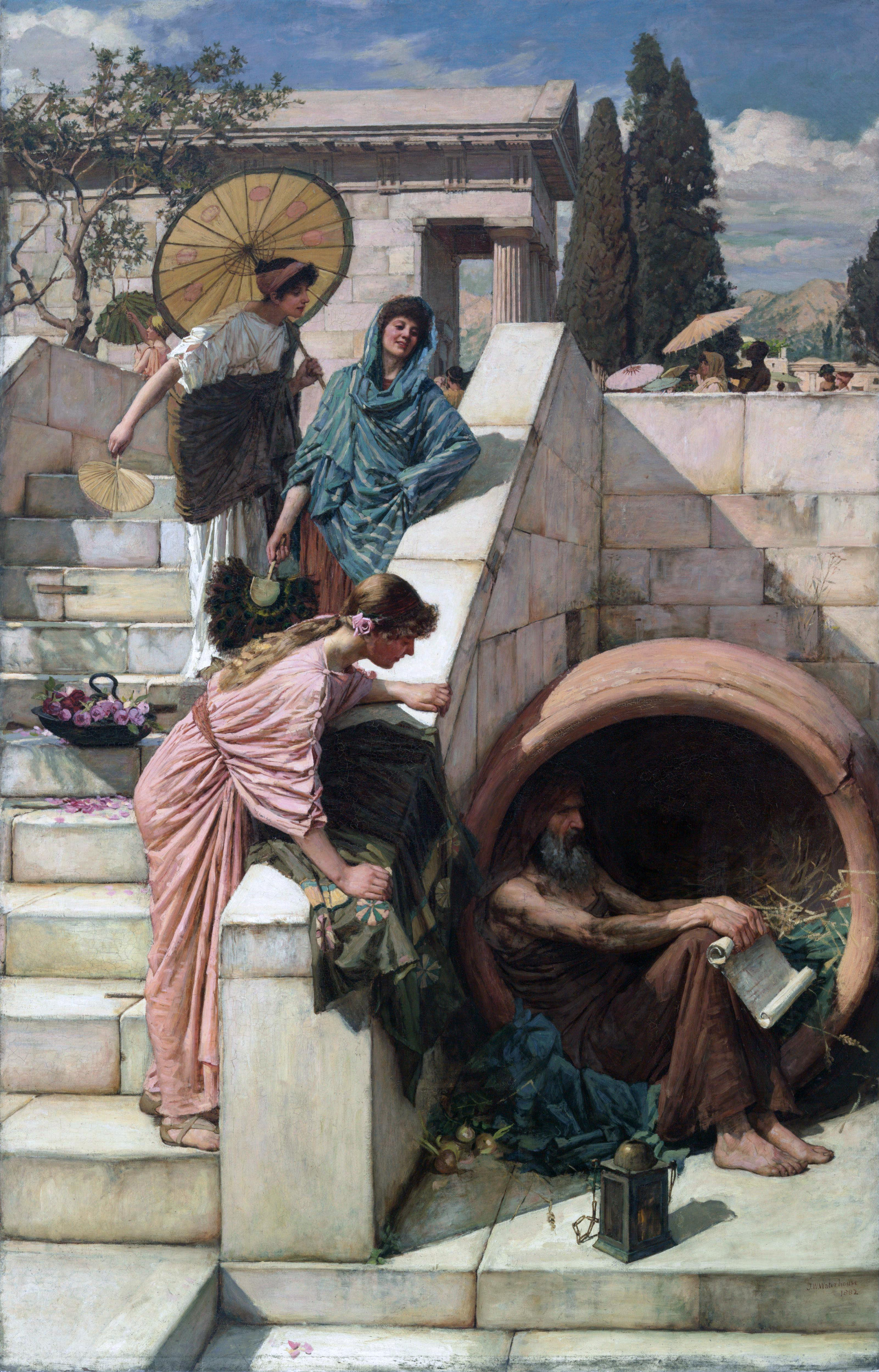
- Artist: John William Waterhouse
- Year: 1882
- Type: Oil on canvas, history painting
- Dimensions: 249 cm × 177.4 cm (98 in × 69.8 in)
- Location: Art Gallery of New South Wales, Sydney

Diogenes is an 1882 history painting by the British artist John William Waterhouse. It depicts a scene from the life of the ancient Greek philosopher Diogenes. Angered by the moral corruption around him, Diogenes lived in a ceramic jar. He is sharply contrasted to the fashionably dressed young women nearby. At the time, Waterhouse was strongly influenced by the work of Lawrence Alma-Tadema, particularly by the accuracy of classical architecture.

The painting was displayed at the Royal Academy Exhibition of 1882 at Burlington House in London. In 1886 it was acquired by the Art Gallery of New South Wales in Sydney.

== See also ==
- List of paintings by John William Waterhouse

== Bibliography ==
- Cavallaro, Daniel. J.W. Waterhouse and the Magic of Color. McFarland, 2017.
- Hobson, Anthony. J W Waterhouse Phaidon Press, 1992.
- Trumble, Angus. Love & Death: Art in the Age of Queen Victoria. Art Gallery of South Australia, 2001.
