= Aristippus the Younger =

4th-century BC Cyrenaic philosopher

- Born: c. 380 BCE; Cyrene
- Era: Ancient philosophy
- Region: Western philosophy
- School: Cyrenaic school
- Main interests: Hedonism

Aristippus the Younger (/ˌærəˈstɪpəs/; Ancient Greek: Ἀρίστιππος; born c. 380 BC), of Cyrene, was a Cyrenaic philosopher in the second half of the 4th century BC. He was the grandson of Aristippus of Cyrene, the founder of the school. According to Diogenes Laërtius, he received the nickname "Mother-taught" (metrodidaktos). because he learned philosophy from his mother, Arete of Cyrene, who was the daughter of the elder Aristippus. Diogenes lists Theodorus the Atheist as one of his students. According to Aristocles of Messene, as quoted by Eusebius, he may have formalized the principles of Cyrenaic philosophy.:

He quite plainly defined the end to be the life of pleasure, ranking as pleasure that which lies in motion. For he said that there are three states affecting our temperament: one, in which we feel pain, like a storm at sea; another, in which we feel pleasure, that may be likened to a gentle undulation, for pleasure is a gentle movement, comparable to a favourable breeze; and the third is an intermediate state, in which we feel neither pain nor pleasure, which is similar to a calm.

Not much else is known about Aristippus the Younger. According to Debra Nails, he may have been conflated with his grandfather.
