= Philiscus of Aegina =

Philiscus of Aegina (Ancient Greek: Φιλίσκος Αἰγινήτης; fl. 4th century BC) was a Cynic philosopher from Aegina, who lived in the latter half of the 4th century BC. He was the son of Onesicritus who sent Philiscus and his younger brother, Androsthenes, to Athens where they were so charmed by the philosophy of Diogenes of Sinope that Onesicritus also came to Athens and became his disciple. According to Hermippus of Smyrna, Philiscus was the pupil of Stilpo. He is also described as an associate of Phocion. The Suda claims that he was a teacher of Alexander the Great, but no other ancient writer mentions this. Aelian, though, has preserved a short exhortation by Philiscus addressed to Alexander:

Take care of your reputation; don't become a plague or a great disaster, bring peace and health.

The Suda mentions that Philiscus wrote dialogues including one called Codrus. Satyrus claimed that the tragedies ascribed to Diogenes were, in fact, written by Philiscus. Among the dialogues ascribed to Diogenes by Sotion, one is entitled Philiscus.
