= Dionysius of Chalcedon =

Ancient Greek philosopher

Dionysius of Chalcedon (Greek: Διονύσιος; fl. 320 BC) was a Greek philosopher and dialectician connected with the Megarian school. He was a native of Chalcedon on the coast of Bithynia. Dionysius was the person who first used the name Dialecticians to describe a splinter group within the Megarian school "because they put their arguments into the form of question and answer". One area of activity for the dialecticians was the framing of definitions, and Aristotle criticises a definition of life by Dionysius in his Topics:

This is, moreover, what happens to Dionysius' definition of "life" when stated as "a movement of a creature sustained by nutriment, congenitally present with it"

Dionysius is also reported to have taught Theodorus the Atheist.
