= Ensor (crater) =

Crater on Mercury

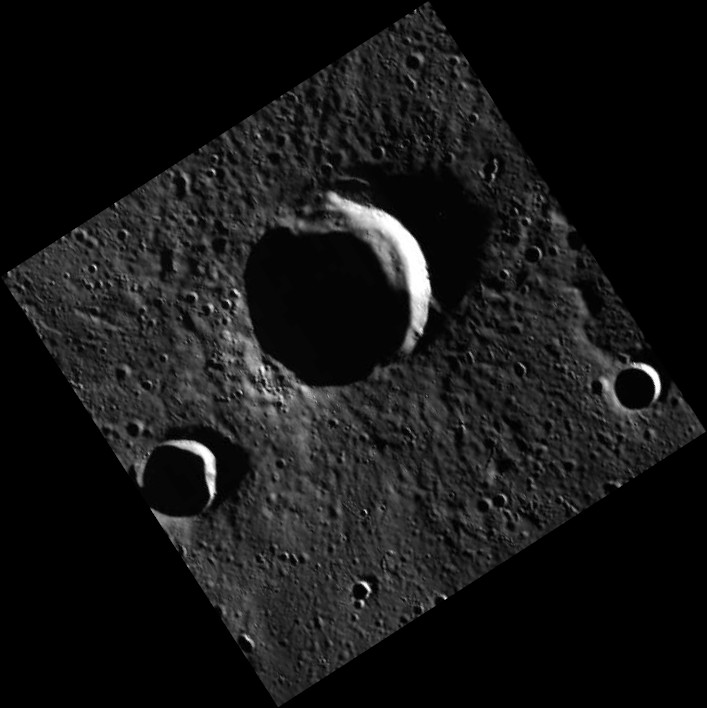
- MESSENGER WAC of Ensor
- Feature type: Impact crater
- Location: Borealis quadrangle, Mercury
- Coordinates: 82.32°N 17.53°W
- Diameter: 24.81 km (15.42 mi)
- Eponym: James Ensor

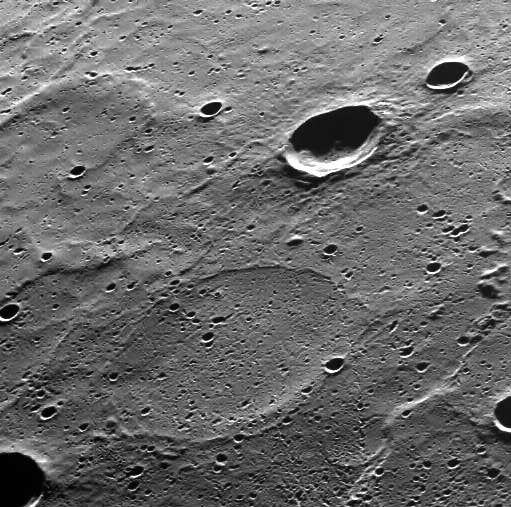
Oblique view showing Ensor (upper right) and Aristoxenus crater (bottom center)

Ensor is a crater on Mercury. Its name was adopted by the International Astronomical Union (IAU) on December 16, 2013. Ensor is named for the Belgian painter James Ensor.
