= Cyrenaics =

Ancient Greek philosophical movement

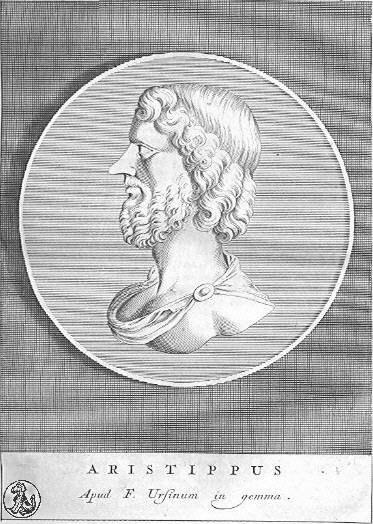
Aristippus of Cyrene

The Cyrenaics, or Kyrenaics (Ancient Greek: Κυρηναϊκοί, romanized: Kyrēnaïkoí), were a sensual hedonist Greek school of philosophy founded in the 4th century BCE, supposedly by Aristippus of Cyrene, although many of the principles of the school are believed to have been formalized by his grandson of the same name, Aristippus the Younger. The school was so called after Cyrene, the birthplace of Aristippus. It was one of the earliest Socratic schools. The Cyrenaics taught that the only intrinsic good is pleasure, which meant not just the absence of pain (as it did for Epicurus), but positively enjoyable sensations. Of these, momentary pleasures, especially physical ones, are stronger than those of anticipation or memory. Further, they recognized the value of social obligation and that pleasure could be gained from altruistic behaviour. The school died out within a century and was replaced by the philosophy of Epicureanism.

== History of the school ==
The history of the Cyrenaic school begins with Aristippus of Cyrene, who was born around 435 BCE. He came to Athens as a young man and became a pupil of Socrates. We have only limited knowledge of his movements after the execution of Socrates in 399 BCE although he is said to have lived for a time in the court of Dionysius of Syracuse. It is uncertain precisely which doctrines ascribed to the Cyrenaic school were formulated by Aristippus.

Among Aristippus' pupils was his daughter, Arete of Cyrene, and among her pupils was her son Aristippus the Younger. It was he, according to Aristocles, who created a comprehensive system. At the least, however, it can be said that the foundations of Cyrenaic philosophy were ideas originated by the elder Aristippus, refined by Arete, and then further refined by Aristippus the Younger.

Other early Cyrenaics included Epitimides, Antipater of Cyrene, Paraebates, Aristotle of Cyrene, and possibly Dionysius the Renegade and Aristoxenus of Cyrene.

=== Later Cyrenaics ===
After the time of the younger Aristippus, the school broke up into different factions, represented by Anniceris, Hegesias, and Theodorus, who all developed rival interpretations of Cyrenaic doctrines, many of which were responses to the new system of hedonistic philosophy laid down by Epicurus.

For Anniceris, pleasure is achieved through individual acts of gratification that are sought for the pleasure that they produce, but Anniceris laid great emphasis on the love of family, country, friendship, and gratitude that provide pleasure even when they demand sacrifice. For Theodorus, the goal of life is mental pleasure not bodily pleasure, and he placed greater emphasis on the need for moderation and justice. He was also famous for being an atheist. To some extent, these philosophers were all trying to meet the challenge laid down by Epicureanism. Hegesias believed that eudaimonia is impossible to achieve, and hence the goal of life becomes the avoidance of pain and sorrow. Conventional values such as wealth, poverty, freedom, and slavery are all indifferent and produce no more pleasure than pain. For Hegesias, Cyrenaic hedonism was simply the least irrational strategy for dealing with the pains of life. Jean-Marie Guyau has compared his teachings to Buddhism.

By the middle of the 3rd century BC, the Cyrenaic school was obsolete; Epicureanism had largely displaced its Cyrenaic rivals.

== Philosophy ==
The Cyrenaics were hedonists and held that pleasure was the supreme good in life, especially physical pleasure, which they thought more intense and more desirable than mental pleasures. Pleasure is the only good in life and pain is the only evil. Socrates had held that virtue was the only human good, but he had also accepted a limited role for its utilitarian side, allowing pleasure to be a secondary goal of moral action. Aristippus and his followers seized upon this, and made pleasure the sole final goal of life, denying that virtue had any intrinsic value.

=== Epistemology ===
The Cyrenaics were known for their skeptical theory of knowledge. They reduced logic to a basic doctrine concerning the criterion of truth. They believed that we can know with certainty our immediate sense-experiences (for instance, that I am having a sweet sensation now) but can know nothing about the nature of the objects that cause these sensations (for instance, that the honey is sweet). They also denied that we can have knowledge of what the experiences of other people are like.

All knowledge is of one's own immediate sensation. These sensations are motions that are purely subjective, and are painful, indifferent, or pleasant, according as they are violent, tranquil, or gentle. Further, they are entirely individual, and can in no way be described as being of the world objectively. Feeling, therefore, is the only possible criterion of knowledge and of conduct. Our ways of being affected are alone knowable. Thus, the sole aim for everyone should be pleasure.

=== Ethics ===
Cyrenaicism deduces a single, universal aim for all people which is pleasure. Furthermore, all feeling is momentary and homogeneous. It follows that past and future pleasure have no real existence for us, and that among present pleasures, there is no distinction of kind. Socrates had spoken of the higher pleasures of the intellect; the Cyrenaics denied the validity of this distinction and said that bodily pleasures, being more simple and more intense, were preferable. Momentary pleasure, preferably of a physical kind, is the only good for humans. When it comes to pain, the Cyrenaics held the opinion that pain that occurs suddenly is more difficult to endure than pain that can be foreseen.

However, some actions that give immediate pleasure can create more than their equivalent of pain. The wise person should be in control of pleasures rather than be enslaved to them; otherwise, pain will result, and this ability requires judgement to evaluate the different pleasures of life. Regard should be paid to law and custom because even though these things have no intrinsic value on their own, violating them will lead to unpleasant penalties being imposed by others. Likewise, friendship and justice are useful because of the pleasure they provide. Thus, the Cyrenaics believed in the hedonistic value of social obligation and altruistic behavior. Like many of the leading modern utilitarians, they combined with their psychological distrust of popular judgments of right and wrong, and their firm conviction that all such distinctions are based solely on law and convention. The equally unwavering principle that the wise person who would pursue pleasure logically must abstain from that which is usually thought wrong or unjust. This idea, which occupies a prominent position in systems like those of Jeremy Bentham, Volney, and even William Paley, was clearly of prime importance to the Cyrenaics.

== Legacy ==
The Cyrenaic ideal was alien to Christianity, and, in general, subsequent thinkers found it an ideal of hopeless pessimism.

== See also ==
- Existential nihilism
- Pleasure principle (psychology)
- Charvaka
- Subjective idealism
