= Aristoxenus of Selinus =

Ancient Greek poet

Aristoxenus (Ancient Greek: Ἀριστόξενος) of Selinus (modern Selinunte in Sicily) was a poet of ancient Greece who is said to have been the first who wrote poetry in anapaestic meters.

Regarding the time in which he lived, we know that he was older than Epicharmus, which puts him some time before that man's lifetime, 540 to 445 BCE. The writer Eusebius places him around the 29th Olympiad (that is, around 664 BCE), but this statement requires some explanation. If Aristoxenus was in fact born in that year, he cannot have been from Selinus, as this city was not founded until around 628 BCE. But Aristoxenus may perhaps have been among the first settlers at Selinus, and thus have come to be regarded as having been from that city.
