= Anniceris =

4th-century BC Greek Cyrenaic philosopher

Anniceris (Ancient Greek: Ἀννίκερις; fl. 300 BC) was a Cyrenaic philosopher. He argued that pleasure is achieved through individual acts of gratification which are sought for the pleasure that they produce, but he also laid great emphasis on the love of family, country, friendship and gratitude, which provide pleasure even when they demand sacrifice.

== Life ==
Anniceris was a disciple of Paraebates, and a fellow student of Hegesias. The Suda says he lived at the time of Alexander the Great (ruled 336–323 BC). Diogenes Laertius tells a story that Anniceris ransomed Plato from Dionysius, tyrant of Syracuse, for twenty minas. This may possibly refer to an earlier Anniceris, possibly the celebrated charioteer mentioned by Aelian.

== Philosophy ==
Anniceris denied that pleasure was merely the absence of pain, for if so death would be a pleasure; and furthermore he denied that pleasure is the general goal of human life. To each separate action, there is a particular end, namely the pleasure which actually results from it. He differed from Aristippus because he allowed that friendship, patriotism, and similar virtues, were good in themselves; saying that the wise person will derive pleasure from such qualities, even though they cause occasional trouble, and that a friend should be chosen not only for our own need, but for kindness and natural affection.

He also denied that reason (Greek: ὁ λόγος) alone can secure us from error; the wise person is the person who has acquired a habit of wise action; human wisdom is liable to lapses at any moment.

The Annicerean (Ἀννικέρειος) sect originated from him.
