= Aristoxenus of Cyrene =

Ancient Greek poet

Aristoxenus (Ancient Greek: Ἀριστόξενος) was a philosopher of ancient Greece who followed the peripatetic school. He was ostensibly from Cyrene, Libya, though some scholars doubt whether he was in fact from there, and wonder whether his name instead indicates he followed the philosophical school of the Cyrenaics. He wrote a number of works mentioned by the writer Diogenes Laërtius, including a work called On Pythagoras and his school and a biography of the philosopher Plato.

He was somewhat infamous for his love of luxury and gluttony, from which he was given the epithet of kolein (κωλήν), which may have meant "leggy" or "haunches" or "hams", and the writer Athenaeus relates that there was in fact a kind of ham called an "Aristoxenus" named after him.

Of his time, we know only that he lived in or before the second century CE.
