= Aristoxenus (crater) =

Crater on Mercury

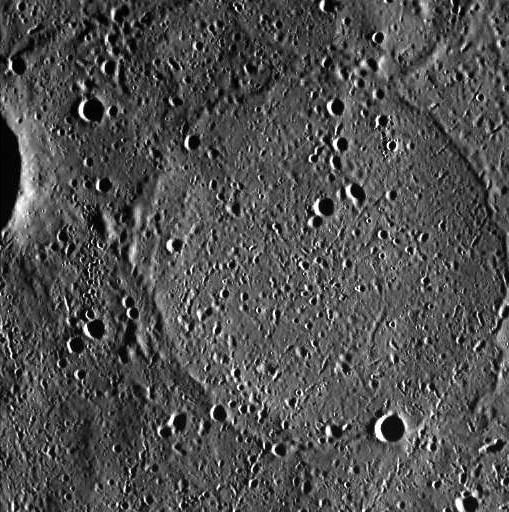
- MESSENGER WAC image
- Feature type: Impact crater
- Location: Borealis quadrangle, Mercury
- Coordinates: 83.93°N 17.46°W
- Diameter: 52.14 km
- Eponym: Aristoxenus

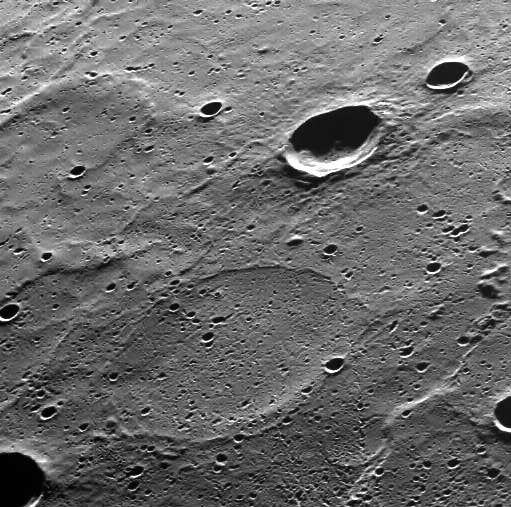
Oblique view also showing Ensor crater

Aristoxenus is an impact crater near the north pole on Mercury. It was named by the IAU in 1979 after the Greek philosopher Aristoxenus.

Aristoxenus is located east of the large Goethe basin.
