= Codex Vaticanus Graecus 64 =

Greek parchment manuscript

Codex Vaticanus Graecus 64, is a Greek manuscript written on parchment, housed at the Vatican Library. It is written on 289 leaves (318 by 205 mm). It was written in Thessaloniki about the year 1270.

The manuscript contains 35 letters, known as Socratic Letters, dated to the 2nd or 3rd century, and written by several authors.

The text of the manuscript was published in 1637 by Leone Allacci.
