= Aristippus =

Greek philosopher, founder of Cyrenaicism (c.435–c.356 BCE)

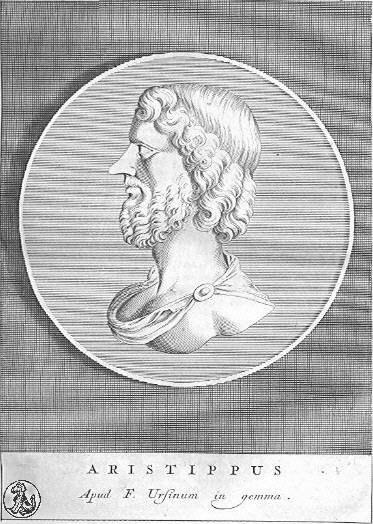
- Born: c. 435 BCE; Cyrene
- Died: c. 356 BCE (aged c. 78 – 79); Athens

Philosophical work
- Era: Ancient Greek philosophy
- Region: Western philosophy
- School: Cyrenaic school
- Main interests: Hedonism, Epistemology
- Notable ideas: Hedonism

Aristippus of Cyrene (/ˌærəˈstɪpəs/; Ancient Greek: Ἀρίστιππος ὁ Κυρηναῖος; c. 435 – c. 356 BCE) was a hedonistic Greek philosopher and the founder of the Cyrenaic school of philosophy. He was a pupil of Socrates, but adopted a different philosophical outlook, teaching that the goal of life was to seek pleasure by adapting circumstances to oneself and by maintaining proper control over both adversity and prosperity. His view that pleasure is the only good came to be called ethical hedonism. Due to the ideological and philosophical differences between Socrates and himself, Aristippus faced backlash from Socrates and many of his fellow pupils. With respect to his hedonistic beliefs, Aristippus's most famous phrase was, "I possess, I am not possessed." Despite having two sons, Aristippus identified his daughter Arete as the "intellectual heiress" of his work, resulting in the systematization of his work and the Cyrenaic school of philosophy, by Arete, and her son Aristippus the Younger, Aristippus's grandson, during the later years of his life and after his death.

There are indications that Aristippus was conflated with his grandson, Aristippus the Younger.

== Life ==
Aristippus, the son of Aritades, was born in Cyrene, Ancient Libya, c. 435 BCE. Having come to Greece to attend the Olympic games, he met and asked Ischomachus about Socrates, resulting in a strong desire to see Socrates, after hearing of his description. Seeking Socrates, he went to Athens and made him his master.

Though a disciple of Socrates, Aristippus wandered both in principle and practice from the teaching and example of his master. After learning the philosophical views and values of Socrates, Aristippus formed a greater interest in pleasure, eventually leading him to popularize and focus more solely on ethical hedonism. Due to his philosophical differences from Socrates, Aristippus sought other avenues, leading him towards the court of Dionysius I of Syracuse or Dionysius the Younger. At the court Aristippus became a counselor, and continued to seek his pleasures. While there he lived luxuriously and sought sensual gratification and the company of the notorious Lais. In addition, Aristippus was the first of Socrates's disciples to make money for his teaching, which on occasion he sent to Socrates, although often it was returned to him, due to Socrates viewing it as an insult. Aristippus also told Socrates that he resided in a foreign land in order to escape the trouble of involving himself in the politics of his native city.

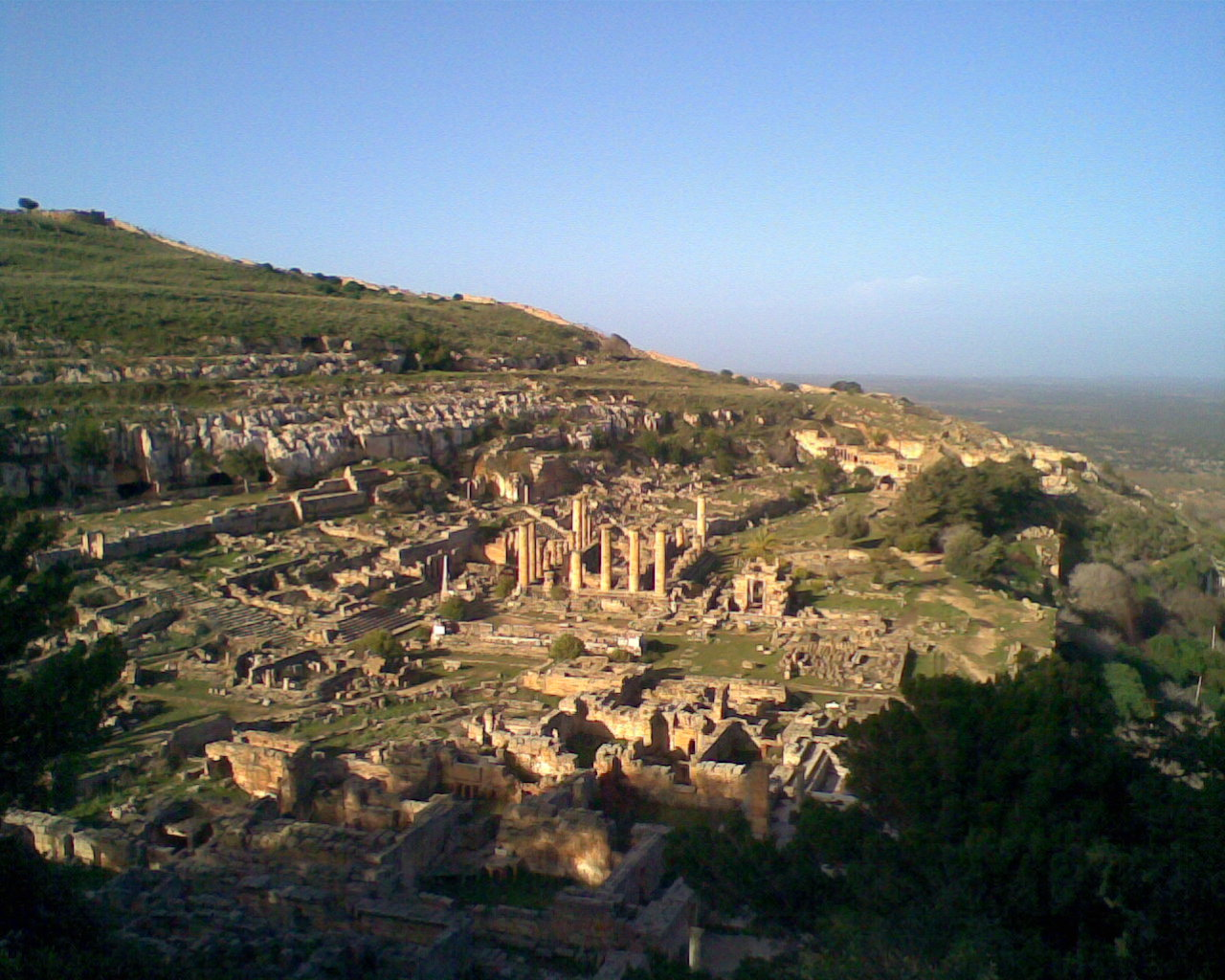
Cyrene, Libya, birthplace of Aristippus

Due to his lifelong pursuit of pleasure and philosophical teachings on pleasure, Aristippus was often in conflict with philosophers like Socrates and his fellow pupils over the course of his life. He is also said to have been taken prisoner by Artaphernes, the satrap who drove the Spartans from Rhodes in 396. Despite the backlash he received for his philosophical views, teachings and lifestyle, Aristippus continued his spread of ethical hedonism by imparting his doctrine to his daughter Arete who, in turn, imparted it to her son, Aristippus the Younger, who is said to have reduced it to a system in the Cyrenaic school of philosophy, that Aristippus helped found. In old age, Aristippus is said to have returned to Cyrene, living out his retirement in luxury and in the pursuit of pleasure till his death, at the age of 79.

In Book VI of De architectura, Vitruvius describes Aristippus:

It is related of the Socratic philosopher Aristippus that, being shipwrecked and cast ashore on the coast of the Rhodians, he observed geometrical figures drawn thereon, and cried out to his companions: "Let us be of good cheer, for I see the traces of man." With that he made for the city of Rhodes, and went straight to the gymnasium. There he fell to discussing philosophical subjects, and presents were bestowed upon him, so that he could not only fit himself out, but could also provide those who accompanied him with clothing and all other necessaries of life. When his companions wished to return to their country, and asked him what message he wished them to carry home, he bade them say this: that children ought to be provided with property and resources of a kind that could swim with them even out of a shipwreck.

== Philosophy ==
Aristippus's philosophies centered around hedonism. Having been a pupil of Socrates, Aristippus recognized Socrates's enjoyment of things like parties, the drinking of wine and accepting gifts. Intrigued by such acts, Aristippus eventually formed the philosophy of ethical hedonism. Aristippus viewed pleasure and the pursuit of pleasure as life's supreme good, as well as valued the importance of not becoming possessed or enslaved by such pleasurable acts and objects. By way of his philosophy, Aristippus's famous phrase, "I possess, I am not possessed," emerged. Having stressed his beliefs, Aristippus admonished his followers to never harm others, and cautioned that the pursuit of pleasure ought to be moderated by moral self-restraint. After forming his philosophy, Aristippus started the Cyrenaic school of philosophy where his philosophical principles would be taught, further structured, and turned into a comprehensive system by his daughter, Arete, and his grandson, Aristippus the Younger.

Despite Aristippus's bringing attention to the value of pursuing pleasure albeit in moderation, Aristippus's hedonistic philosophy often received backlash by Socrates and his fellow-pupils. While Socrates did indulge in such activities like parties, drinking wine and accepting gifts, Socrates viewed virtue as more valuable than pleasure. Since Aristippus valued pleasure more than Socrates did and found less intrinsic value in virtue, other philosophers, like Plato and Xenophon, supported as well as initiated the accusation that Aristippus had defied and had strayed from Socrates's philosophical teachings. Aristotle is also noted for calling him a sophist. Due to the differences in philosophical values and beliefs, Aristippus and his hedonistic philosophy separated him from Socrates as well as from other prominent philosophers at that time. One notable example of philosophers demonstrating disdain for Aristippus's values is in Plato's Phaedo, where Plato describes Aristippus having been at Aegina, a pleasure resort, rather than attending as a witness of Socrates's death.

Of the anecdotes that survive about Aristippus, those from Diogenes Laërtius are the most abundant. Diogenes asserts, for example, that to observe the precepts of Aristippus is "to endeavor to adapt circumstances to myself, not myself to circumstances" and that, "every complexion of life, every station and circumstance sat gracefully upon him." Another such report is of Aristippus being reproached for his love of bodily indulgences, to which Aristippus is said to have answered, "It is not abstinence from pleasures that is best, but mastery over them without ever being worsted."

== Works ==
None of Aristippus's works are extant. Diogenes Laërtius, on the authority of Sotion and Panaetius, gives a long list of books whose authorship is ascribed to Aristippus, though he also states that according to Sosicrates of Rhodes, Aristippus never wrote anything. Some letters attributed to him are said by some to be forgeries.

One work attributed to Aristippus in ancient times was a book entitled On Ancient Luxury (or On the Luxury of the Ancients; Greek: Περὶ παλαιᾶς τρυφῆς); although it has long been considered that this work could not have been written by Aristippus of Cyrene, not least because the author mentions Theophrastus, who lived a generation after Aristippus. The name may have been adopted by the writer to suggest a connection with the hedonistic philosopher. This work, judging by the quotations preserved by Diogenes Laërtius, has also been presumed to have been filled with anecdotes about philosophers and their supposed taste for courtesans or boys.
