= List of works by Lucian =

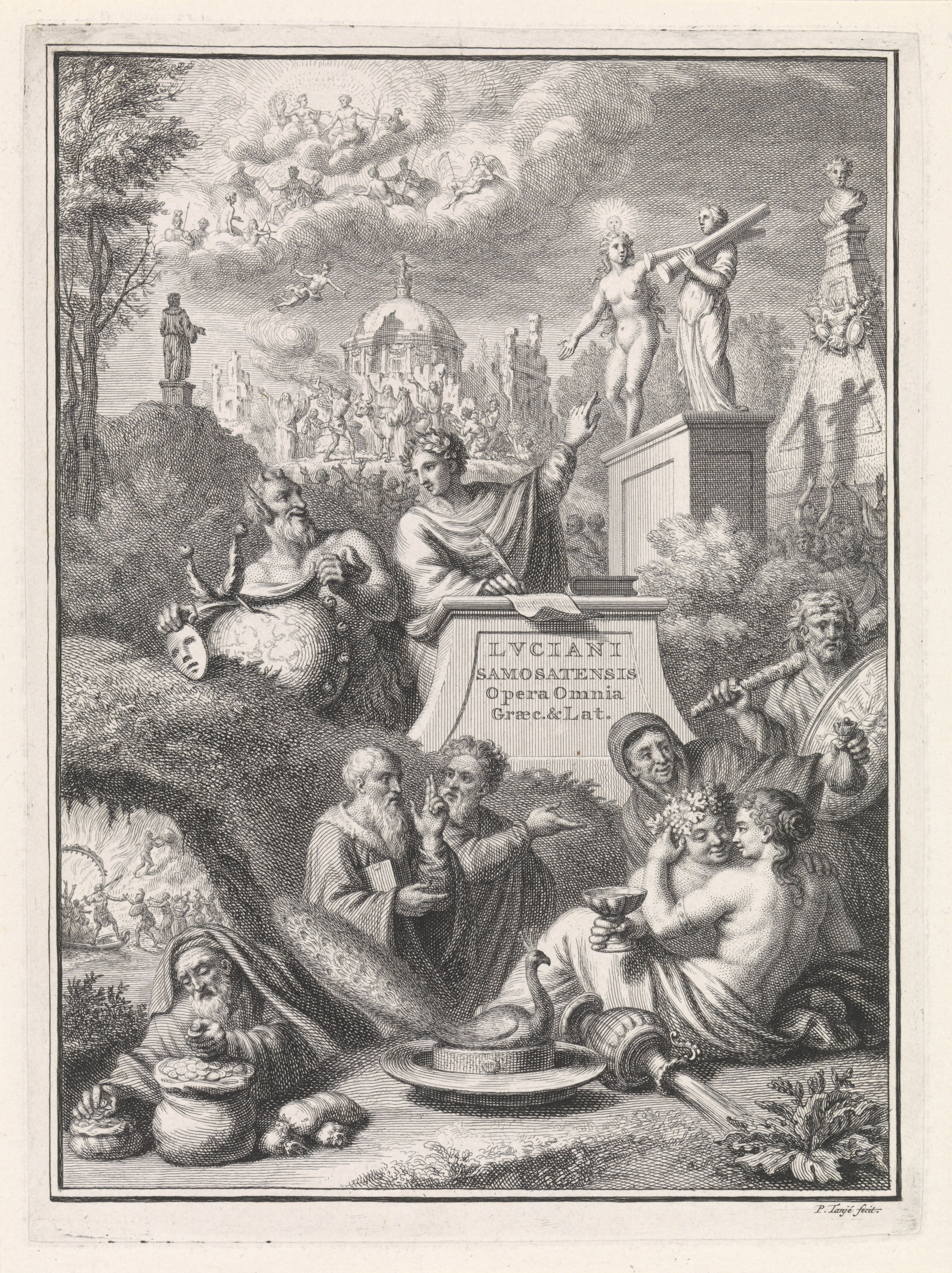
Lucian. Opera. Amsterdam: Jacobus Wetstein, 1743.

A list of works by Lucian (c. AD 125 – after AD 180), who wrote in Ancient Greek.

The order of the works is that of the Oxford Classical Texts edition. The English titles are taken from Loeb (alternative translations are sometimes given in brackets). The traditional Latin titles have also been given.

Some of the works are probably not by Lucian. Those whose attribution is almost certainly wrong are listed at the end. Other works whose authenticity is disputed are marked "[?]". Four works whose genuineness was once questioned but are now generally believed to be by Lucian are marked with an asterisk.

== List of works ==
Greek title	Latin title	English title	Brief description
Φάλαρις Α	Phalaris I	Phalaris 1	A paradoxical defence of the notorious tyrant Phalaris.
Φάλαρις Β	Phalaris II	Phalaris 2	The second part of the above.
Ἱππίας ἢ Βαλανεῖον	Hippias	Hippias or The Bath	A description of a Roman bath-house.
Διόνυσος	Bacchus	Dionysus	A short essay about the god Dionysus and his journey to India.
Ἡρακλῆς	Hercules	Heracles or Hercules	A short essay on the Gaulish god Ogmios, whom Lucian associates with the Greek Heracles.
Περὶ τοῦ Ἡλέκτρου ἢ Κύκνων	Electrum	Amber or The Swans	The author visits the River Eridanos and is disappointed to find it has neither swans nor amber (as in the myth of Phaëton).
Μυίας Ἐγκώμιον	Muscae Encomium	The Fly (Praising a Fly)	A paradoxical encomium of the insect of the title.
Νιγρίνου Φιλοσοφία	Nigrinus	Nigrinus	A diatribe against the city of Rome put into the mouth of the philosopher Nigrinus.
Δημώνακτος Βίος	Demonax	Demonax	A biography of the cynic philosopher Demonax. Keith Sidwell has suggested that Demonax was Lucian's creation.
Περὶ τοῦ Οἴκου	De Domo	The Hall	A description of a magnificent building.
Πατρίδος Ἐγκώμιον	Patriae Encomium	My Native Land (An Encomium of Fatherland)	"A highly conventional rhetorical piece" in praise of patriotism.
[?] Μακρόβιοι	Macrobii	Octogenerians (Long-livers)	A list of people famous for reaching extreme old age.
Ἀληθῶν Διηγημάτων Α	Verae historiae I	A True Story 1 (True History)	One of Lucian's most famous works. A parody of travellers' tales. The narrator and his companions set out on a voyage and are lifted up by a giant waterspout and deposited on the Moon. There they find themselves embroiled in a full-scale war between the king of the Moon and the king of the Sun. On returning to Earth, the adventurers become trapped in a giant whale.
Ἀληθῶν Διηγημάτων Β	Verae historiae II	A True Story 2	Part two of the above, in which the narrator and his companions escape from the whale, reach a sea of milk, an island of cheese and the isle of the blessed, where a whole host of heroes and literary figures are to be found.
Περὶ τοῦ μὴ ῥᾳδίως πιστεύειν Διαβολῇ	Calumniae non temere credendum	Slander	An essay against believing slander too readily. Lucian's description of a painting by Apelles in this work influenced many later artists, including Botticelli.
*Δίκη Συμφώνων	Lis Consonantium (or Iudicium Vocalium)	The Consonants at Law	The consonant sigma sues the consonant tau for stealing words from him. The case is heard by a jury of the seven vowels.
Συμπόσιον ἢ Λαπίθαι	Symposium	The Carousal (Symposium), or The Lapiths	A parody of Plato's Symposium. A philosophers' banquet ends in drunken violence.
[?] Ψευδοσοφιστής ἢ Σολοικιστής	Soloecista	Soloecista	A discussion of grammatical errors (solecisms).
Κατάπλους ἢ Τύραννος	Cataplus	The Downward Journey or The Tyrant	A group of dead people, including the tyrant Megapenthes, are carried to the Underworld in Charon's boat. Only the cobbler Micyllus accepts his fate with resignation.
Ζεὺς ἐλεγχόμενος	Jupiter confutatus	Zeus Catechized (Zeus Cross-Examined)	A dialogue concerning the contradiction between the power of fate and divine omnipotence.
Ζεὺς Τραγῳδός	Jupiter Tragoedus	Zeus Rants	A parody of Greek tragedy and a discussion of the conflicting Stoic and Epicurean ideas about the nature of the gods.
Ὄνειρος ἢ Ἀλεκτρυών	Gallus	The Dream or The Cock	The poor cobbler Micyllus threatens to kill a cockerel which has woken him from a dream of riches. The cockerel explains that he is a reincarnation of Pythagoras. He grants Micyllus the power of invisibility so he can show him the private life of the rich and prove the cobbler is far better off in his poverty.
Προμηθεύς	Prometheus	Prometheus	Prometheus defends himself against the charges of stealing meat from Zeus, stealing fire from heaven and creating mankind.
Ἰκαρομένιππος ἢ Ὑπερνέφελος	Icaromenippus	Icaromenippus or The Sky-man	Imitating Icarus, Menippus makes himself a pair of wings and flies up to the gods where he learns that Zeus has decided to destroy all philosophers as useless.
Τίμων	Timon	Timon or The Misanthrope	A dialogue involving Timon of Athens. Lucian's work influenced the play by Shakespeare.
Χάρων ἢ Ἐπισκοποῦντες	Charon sive Contemplantes	Charon or The Inspectors	A dialogue between Hermes and Charon about the vanity of human wishes.
Βίων Πρᾶσις	Vitarum auctio	Philosophies for Sale (Sale of Creeds)	Zeus puts various philosophers up for sale in a slave market.
Ἀναβιοῦντες ἢ Ἁλιεύς	Revivescentes sive Piscator	The Dead Come to Life or The Fisherman	A sequel to Philosophies for Sale.
Δὶς κατηγορούμενος	Bis accusatus sive Tribunalia	The Double Indictment or Trials by Jury	Lucian defends his literary style against his critics.
Περὶ Θυσιῶν	De Sacrificiis	On Sacrifices	A short diatribe on sacrifices from a Cynic perspective.
Πρὸς τὸν ἀπαίδευτον καὶ πολλὰ βιβλία ὠνούμενον	Adversus Indoctum	The Ignorant Book-Collector (Fowler's title is Remarks addressed to an illiterate book-fancier)	A diatribe against a Syrian book-collector.
Περὶ τοῦ Ἐνυπνίου ἤτοι Βίος Λουκιανοῦ	Somnium sive Vita Luciani	The Dream or Lucian's Career	Lucian tells how a vision inspired him to abandon a career in sculpture for one in literature.
*Περὶ τοῦ Παρασίτου ὅτι Τέχνη ἡ Παρασιτική	De Parasito	The Parasite: Parasitic an Art	Lucian ironically proves that parasitism is the highest of all art forms.
Φιλοψευδὴς ἢ Ἀπιστῶν	Philopseudes sive Incredulus	The Lover of Lies, or The Doubter	A collection of tall tales, including a story similar to Sorcerer's Apprentice.
Θεῶν Κρίσις	Dearum Iudicium	The Judgement of the Goddesses	A dialogue based on the Judgement of Paris.
Περὶ τῶν ἐν Μισθῷ συνόντων	De Mercede conductis	On Salaried Posts in Great Houses (The Dependent Scholar)	"A Hogarthian sketch of the life led by educated Greeks who attached themselves to the households of great Roman lords – and ladies".
Ἀνάχαρσις ἢ Περὶ Γυμνασίων	Anacharsis	Anacharsis or Athletics	A dialogue between Solon and Anacharsis about athletics.
Μένιππος ἢ Νεκυομαντεία	Necyomantia	Menippus or The Descent Into Hades	The Cynic philosopher Menippus visits the Underworld to ask Teiresias which is the true philosophy.
[?] Λούκιος ἢ Ὄνος	Asinus	Lucius or The Ass	A short novel about a man transformed into a donkey. The surviving version of this work is possibly abbreviated and may not be by Lucian. The same story is told at greater length in the Golden Ass by Apuleius.
Περὶ Πένθους	De Luctu	On Funerals (On Mourning)	A diatribe on mourning from a Cynic perspective.
Ῥητόρων Διδάσκαλος	Rhetorum Praeceptor	A Professor of Public Speaking	A satire on contemporary oratory.
Ἀλέξανδρος ἢ Ψευδόμαντις	Alexander	Alexander the False Prophet	An account of the fraudulent prophet Alexander of Abonoteichus.
Εἰκόνες	Imagines	Essays in Portraiture (Images)	A eulogy of Panthea, the mistress of the Roman emperor Lucius Verus. Critics have doubted the sincerity of the praise.
*Περὶ τῆς Συρίης Θεοῦ	De Syria Dea	The Goddesse of Surrye (The Syrian Goddess, often known under the Latin title De Dea Syria)	A description of the cult of the goddess Atargatis. Written in Ionic Greek in imitation of Herodotus.
Περὶ Ὀρχήσεως	De Saltatione	The Dance (Of Pantomime)	A defence of the Roman art of pantomime.
Λεξιφάνης	Lexiphanes	Lexiphanes	A satire on linguistic pretentiousness.
Εὐνοῦχος	Eunuchus	The Eunuch	A satire on money-grubbing philosophers.
*Περὶ τῆς Ἀστρολογίας	De Astrologia	Astrology	An essay on astrology in Ionic Greek.
Ἔρωτες	Amores	Amores (Affairs of the Heart)	A comparison between the love of women and the love of boys.
Ὑπὲρ τῶν Εἰκόνων	Pro Imaginibus	Essays in Portraiture Defended	A defence of his essay.
Ψευδολογιστής	Pseudologista	The Mistaken Critic	Lucian attacks a critic who had accused him of writing poor Attic Greek.
Θεῶν Ἐκκλησία	Deorum Concilium	The Parliament of the Gods	A dialogue in which Momus complains that too many foreigners and mortals have been admitted to the ranks of the Greek gods. His targets include Dionysus, Apis and Anubis.
Τυραννοκτόνος	Tyrannicida	The Tyrannicide	A declamation on a fictitious subject. The speaker had planned to assassinate a tyrant but was only able to kill his son instead. On hearing the news of his son's death, the tyrant committed suicide. The speaker now claims he is owed a reward as a tyrannicide.
Ἀποκηρυττόμενος	Abdicatus	Disowned	Another fictitious declamation, this time about a disowned son.
Περὶ τῆς Περεγρίνου Τελευτῆς	De Morte Peregrini	The Passing of Peregrinus	An account of the death of the former Christian Cynic philosopher Peregrinus Proteus who committed suicide by cremating himself on a funeral pyre at the Olympic Games in 165 AD
Δραπέται	Fugitivi	The Runaways	An attack on contemporary Cynics.
Τόξαρις ἢ Φιλία	Toxaris sive Amicitia	Toxaris or Friendship	A dialogue between the Scythian Toxaris and the Greek Mnesippus about friendship, inspired by the Scythian worship of Orestes and Pylades.
[?] Δημοσθένους Ἐγκώμιον	Demosthenis Encomium	Demosthenes	Praise of the orator Demosthenes.
Πῶς δεῖ Ἱστορίαν συγγράφειν	Quomodo Historia conscribenda sit	How to Write History	Lucian's criticism of contemporary historians.
Περὶ τῶν Διψάδων	Dipsades	The Dipsads	A description of the "dipsas" or "thirst-snake".
Τὰ πρὸς Κρόνον	Saturnalia	Saturnalia	A description of the Roman festival of Saturnalia.
Ἡρόδοτος ἢ Ἀετίων	Herodotus	Herodotus or Aetion	An account of how the historian Herodotus and the painter Aetion both publicised their works at the Olympic Games. It contains a description of Aetion's picture of the marriage of Alexander the Great and Roxana.
Ζεύξις ἢ Ἀντίοχος	Zeuxis	Zeuxis or Antiochus	Anecdotes about the painter Zeuxis and the Seleucid king Antiochus I Soter. It contains a description of a painting of a centaur by Zeuxis.
Ὑπὲρ τοῦ ἐν τῇ Προσαγορεύσει Πταίσματος	Pro Lapsu inter salutandum	A Slip of the Tongue in Greeting	Lucian analyses a slip of the tongue he made when greeting his patron.
Ἀπολογία	Apologia	Apology for the "Salaried Posts in Great Houses"	A defence of his own essay.
Ἁρμονίδης	Harmonides	Harmonides	An anecdote about the flute-player Harmonides.
Διάλογος πρὸς Ἡσίοδον	Hesiodus	A Conversation with Hesiod	Lycinus (Lucian) mocks the prophetic claims of the poet Hesiod.
Σκύθης ἢ Πρόξενος	Scytha	The Scythian or the Consul	The story of the Scythian Toxaris and his visit to Athens. This short work was possibly intended as an introduction to Toxaris or Friendship.
Ποδάγρα	Podagra	Podagra (Gout)	A mock Greek tragedy featuring gout.
Ἑρμότιμος ἢ Περὶ Αἱρέσεων	Hermotimus	Hermotimus or Concerning the Sects	The longest of Lucian's works. A philosophical dialogue, modelled on those of Plato, between an old Stoic, Hermotimus, and Lycinus (who represents Lucian himself).
Πρὸς τὸν εἰπόντα Προμηθεὺς εἶ ἐν λόγοις	Prometheus es in Verbis	To One Who Said "You're a Prometheus in Words" (A Literary Prometheus)	Lucian's defence of his own literary style.
[?] Ἀλκυὼν ἢ Περὶ Μεταμορφώσεων	Halcyon	Halcyon	A socratic dialogue featuring a description of the mythological bird, the halcyon.
Πλοῖον ἢ Εὐχαί	Navigium	The Ship or The Wishes	The sight of a huge Egyptian grain-ship prompts a discussion among friends about what they most desire. Adeimantus would have the ship filled with gold and live a life of luxury; Samippus would like to be a world-conquering king; Timolaus wants magic powers, including invisibility. After hearing them all, Lycinus (Lucian), says that he is content with the privilege of laughing at the others, especially when they claim to be philosophers.
[?] Ὠκύπους	Ocypus	Ocypus (Swift-of-Foot)	Another mock tragedy.
[?] Κυνικός	Cynicus	Cynicus (The Cynic)	A dialogue between Lycinus (i.e. Lucian) and a Cynic philosopher.
Νεκρικοὶ Διάλογοι	Dialogi Mortuorum	Dialogues of the Dead	30 miniature dialogues set in the Underworld. Among the most famous of Lucian's works.
Ἐνάλιοι Διάλογοι	Dialogi Marini	Dialogues of the Sea Gods	15 miniature dialogues
Θεῶν Διάλογοι	Dialogi Deorum	Dialogues of the Gods	25 miniature dialogues mocking the Homeric conception of the Greek gods.
Ἑταιρικοὶ Διάλογοι	Dialogi Meretricii	Dialogues of the Courtesans	15 miniature dialogues between hetairai. The style is influenced by the New Comedy and the mimes of authors such as Herondas.
Lost work
Σώστρατος	Sostratus	Sostratus	Mentioned by Lucian in Demonax.
Definitely spurious works
Ἐπιστολαί	Epistulae	Letters	Collections of letters ascribed to Lucian.
Φιλόπατρις ἢ Διδασκόμενος	Philopatris	Philopatris (The Patriot)	A c. 11th century Byzantine imitation. Controversial because it was once believed to be an attack on Christianity.
Χαρίδημος ἢ Περὶ Κάλλους	Charidemus	Charidemus	A discussion of aesthetics.
Νέρων	Nero	Nero	About the Roman emperor Nero.
Ἐπιγράμματα	Epigrammata	Epigrams	Several epigrams in the Greek Anthology are attributed to Lucian.
Τιμαρίων ἢ Περὶ τῶν κατ' αὐτὸν Παθημάτων	Timarion	Timarion	Another Byzantine imitation, prob. 12th century, possibly later.

== Editions ==
- The works of Lucian in eight volumes, edited and translated by A.M.Harmon, K. Kilburn and M.D. Macleod (Loeb Classical Library, 1913–1967)
- Luciani Opera, edited by Matthew Donald Macleod, 4 volumes (Oxford Classical Texts, 1972–1987)

=== Translations into English ===
Complete

- Loeb edition by Harmon, Kilburn and Macleod (as above)
- The Works of Lucian translated by H.W. Fowler and F. G. Fowler, four volumes (Oxford University Press, 1905)

Selections

- Chattering Courtesans and Other Sardonic Sketches translated by Keith Sidwell (Penguin Classics, 2004)
- Selected Dialogues translated by C. D. N. Costa (Oxford World's Classics, 2006)
- On the Syrian Goddess, Jane Lightfoot, 2000, OUP, 1989

== Secondary sources ==
- The Oxford Companion to Classical Literature ed. M. C. Howatson (Second edition, OUP, 1989)
