= Lucian =

2nd-century Syrian satirist and rhetorician

- Born: c. 125 AD; Samosata, Roman Syria
- Died: After 180 AD probably Egypt, Roman Empire
- Occupations: Novelist, satirist, rhetorician
- Writing career
- Notable works: A True History; Dialogues of the Dead; Lover of Lies; Dialogues of the Gods; Dialogues of the Courtesans; Alexander the False Prophet; Philosophies for Sale; The Carousal, or The Lapiths

Lucian of Samosata (Note: /ˈljuːʃən, -siən/; Ancient Greek: Λουκιανὸς ὁ Σαμοσατεύς, Loukianòs ho Samosateús; Latin: Lucianus Samosatensis) (c. 125 – after 180) was a Hellenized Syrian satirist, rhetorician and pamphleteer who is best known for his characteristic tongue-in-cheek style, with which he frequently ridiculed philosophers and priests, speculative beliefs about the nature of the universe, religious practices, and superstitions. Although his native language was probably Syriac, all of his extant works are written entirely in ancient Greek (mostly in the Attic Greek dialect popular during the Second Sophistic period).

Everything that is known about Lucian's life comes from his own writings, which are often difficult to interpret because of his extensive use of sarcasm. According to his oration The Dream, he was the son of a lower middle class family from the city of Samosata along the banks of the Euphrates in the remote Roman province of Syria. As a young man, he was apprenticed to his uncle to become a sculptor, but, after a failed attempt at sculpting, he ran away to pursue an education in Ionia. He may have become a travelling lecturer and visited universities throughout the Roman Empire. After acquiring fame and wealth through his teaching, Lucian finally settled down in Athens for a decade, during which he wrote most of his extant works. In his fifties, he may have been appointed as a highly paid government official in Egypt, after which point he disappears from the historical record.

Lucian's works were wildly popular in antiquity, and more than eighty writings attributed to him have survived to the present day, a considerably higher quantity than for most other classical writers. His most famous work is A True Story, a tongue-in-cheek satire against authors who tell incredible tales, which is regarded by some as the earliest known work of science fiction. Lucian invented the genre of comic dialogue, a parody of the traditional Socratic dialogue. His dialogue Lover of Lies makes fun of people who believe in the supernatural and contains the oldest known version of "The Sorcerer's Apprentice". Lucian wrote numerous satires making fun of traditional stories about the gods including The Dialogues of the Gods, Icaromenippus, Zeus Rants, Zeus Catechized, and The Parliament of the Gods. His Dialogues of the Dead focuses on the Cynic philosophers Diogenes and Menippus. Philosophies for Sale and The Carousal, or The Lapiths make fun of various philosophical schools, and The Fisherman or the Dead Come to Life is a defense of this mockery. Lucian often ridiculed public figures, such as the Cynic philosopher Peregrinus Proteus in his letter The Passing of Peregrinus and the fraudulent oracle Alexander of Abonoteichus in his treatise Alexander the False Prophet. Lucian's treatise On the Syrian Goddess satirizes cultural distinctions between Greeks and Syrians and is the main source of information about the cult of Atargatis.

Lucian had a wide-ranging impact on Western literature. Works inspired by his writings include Thomas More's Utopia, the works of François Rabelais, William Shakespeare's Timon of Athens and Jonathan Swift's Gulliver's Travels.

== Biographical sources ==
Lucian is not mentioned in any contemporary texts or inscriptions written by others, and he is not included in Philostratus's Lives of the Sophists. As a result of this, everything that is known about Lucian comes exclusively from his own writings. A variety of characters with names very similar to Lucian, including "Lukinos", "Lukianos", "Lucius", and "The Syrian" appear throughout Lucian's writings. These have been frequently interpreted by scholars and biographers as "masks", "alter-egos", or "mouthpieces" of the author. Daniel S. Richter criticizes the frequent tendency to interpret such "Lucian-like figures" as self-inserts by the author and argues that they are, in fact, merely fictional characters Lucian uses to "think with" when satirizing conventional distinctions between Greeks and Syrians. He suggests that they are primarily a literary trope used by Lucian to deflect accusations that he as the Syrian author "has somehow outraged the purity of Greek idiom or genre" through his invention of the comic dialogue. British classicist Donald Russell states, "A good deal of what Lucian says about himself is no more to be trusted than the voyage to the moon that he recounts so persuasively in the first person in True Stories" and warns that "it is foolish to treat [the information he gives about himself in his writings] as autobiography."

== Background and upbringing ==
Map of Anatolia showing locations associated with Lucian. Modern Turkey in yellow.

Lucian was born in the town of Samosata on the banks of the Euphrates on the far eastern outskirts of the Roman Empire. Samosata had been the capital of the kingdom of Commagene until 72 AD when it was annexed by Vespasian and became part of the Roman province of Syria. The population of the town was mostly Syrian and Lucian's native tongue was probably Syriac, a form of Middle Aramaic.

During the time when Lucian lived, traditional Greco-Roman religion was in decline and its role in society had become largely ceremonial. As a substitute for traditional religion, many people in the Hellenistic world joined mystery cults, such as the Mysteries of Isis, Mithraism, the cult of Cybele, and the Eleusinian Mysteries. Superstition had always been common throughout ancient society, but it was especially prevalent during the second century. Most educated people of Lucian's time adhered to one of the various Hellenistic philosophies, of which the major ones were Stoicism, Platonism, Peripateticism, Pyrrhonism, and Epicureanism. Every major town had its own 'university' and these 'universities' often employed professional travelling lecturers, who were frequently paid high sums of money to lecture about various philosophical teachings. The most prestigious center of learning was the city of Athens in Greece, which had a long intellectual history.

According to Lucian's oration The Dream, which classical scholar Lionel Casson states he probably delivered as an address upon returning to Samosata at the age of thirty-five or forty after establishing his reputation as a great orator, Lucian's parents were lower middle class and his uncles owned a local statue-making shop. Lucian's parents could not afford to give him a higher education, so, after he completed his elementary schooling, Lucian's uncle took him on as an apprentice and began teaching him how to sculpt. Lucian, however, soon proved to be poor at sculpting and ruined the statue he had been working on. His uncle beat him, causing him to run off. Lucian fell asleep and experienced a dream in which he was being fought over by the personifications of Statuary and Culture. He decided to listen to Culture and thus sought out an education.

Although The Dream has long been treated by scholars as a truthful autobiography of Lucian, its historical accuracy is questionable at best. Classicist Simon Swain calls it "a fine but rather apocryphal version of Lucian's education" and Karin Schlapbach calls it "ironical". Richter argues that it is not autobiographical at all, but rather a prolalia (προλᾰλιά), or playful literary work, and a "complicated meditation on a young man's acquisition of paideia" [i.e. education]. Russell dismisses The Dream as entirely fictional, noting, "We recall that Socrates too started as sculptor, and Ovid's vision of Elegy and Tragedy (Amores 3.1) is all too similar to Lucian's."

== Education and career ==
In Lucian's Double Indictment, the personification of Rhetoric delivers a speech in which she describes the unnamed defendant, who is described as a "Syrian" author of transgressive dialogues, at the time she found him, as a young man wandering in Ionia in Anatolia "with no idea what he ought to do with himself". She describes "the Syrian" at this stage in his career as "still speaking in a barbarous manner and all but wearing a caftan [kandys] in the Assyrian fashion". Rhetoric states that she "took him in hand and ... gave him paideia".

Scholars have long interpreted the "Syrian" in this work as Lucian himself and taken this speech to mean that Lucian ran away to Ionia, where he pursued his education. Richter, however, argues that the "Syrian" is not Lucian himself, but rather a literary device Lucian uses to subvert literary and ethnic norms.

Ionia was the center of rhetorical learning at the time. The most prestigious universities of rhetoric were in Ephesus and Smyrna, but it is unlikely that Lucian could have afforded to pay the tuition at either of these schools. It is not known how Lucian obtained his education, but somehow he managed to acquire an extensive knowledge of rhetoric as well as classical literature and philosophy.

Lucian mentions in his dialogue The Fisherman that he had initially attempted to apply his knowledge of rhetoric and become a lawyer, but that he had become disillusioned by the deceitfulness of the trade and resolved to become a philosopher instead. Lucian travelled across the Empire, lecturing throughout Greece, Italy, and Gaul. In Gaul, Lucian may have held a position as a highly paid government professor.

In around 160, Lucian returned to Ionia as a wealthy celebrity. He visited Samosata and stayed in the east for several years. He is recorded as having been in Antioch in either 162 or 163. In around 165, he bought a house in Athens and invited his parents to come live with him in the city. Lucian must have married at some point during his travels because in one of his writings, he mentions having a son at this point.

Lucian lived in Athens for around a decade, during which time he gave up lecturing and instead devoted his attention to writing. It was during this decade that Lucian composed nearly all his most famous works. Lucian wrote exclusively in Greek, mainly in the Attic Greek popular during the Second Sophistic, but On the Syrian Goddess, which is attributed to Lucian, is written in a highly successful imitation of Herodotus' Ionic Greek, leading some scholars to believe that Lucian may not be the real author.

For unknown reasons, Lucian stopped writing around 175 and began travelling and lecturing again. During the reign of Emperor Commodus (180–192), the aging Lucian may have been appointed to a lucrative government position in Egypt. After this point, he disappears from the historical record entirely, and nothing is known about his death.

== Views ==
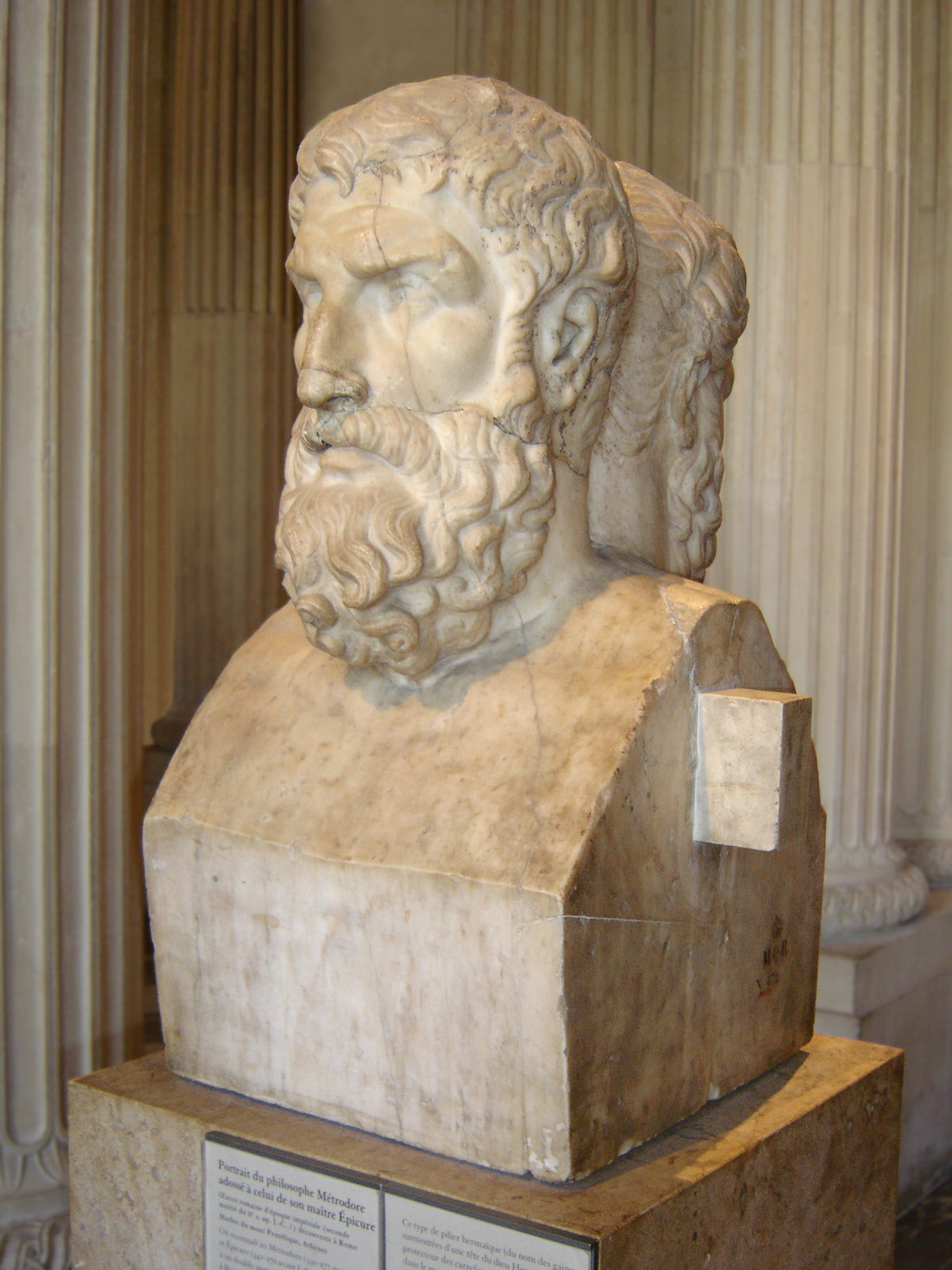
Bust of Epicurus, an Athenian philosopher whom Lucian greatly admired

Lucian's philosophical views are difficult to categorize due to his persistent use of irony and sarcasm. In The Fisherman, Lucian describes himself as a champion of philosophy and throughout his other writings he characterizes philosophy as a morally constructive discipline, but he is critical of pseudo-philosophers, whom he portrays as greedy, bad-tempered, sexually immoral hypocrites. Lucian was not known to be a member of any of the major philosophical schools. In his Philosophies for Sale, he makes fun of members of every school. Lucian was critical of Stoicism and Platonism, because he regarded them as encouraging superstition. His Nigrinus superficially appears to be a "eulogy of Platonism", but may, in fact, be satirical, or merely an excuse to ridicule Roman society.

Nonetheless, at other times, Lucian writes approvingly of individual philosophies. According to Turner, although Lucian makes fun of Skeptic philosophers, he displays a temperamental inclination towards that philosophy. Edwyn Bevan identifies Lucian as a Skeptic, and in his Hermotimus, Lucian rejects all philosophical systems as contradictory and concludes that life is too short to determine which of them comes nearest to the truth, so the best solution is to rely on common sense, which was what the Pyrrhonian Skeptics advocated. The maxim that "Eyes are better witnesses than ears" is echoed repeatedly throughout several of Lucian's dialogues.

Lucian was skeptical of oracles, though he was by no means the only person of his time to voice such skepticism. Lucian rejected belief in the paranormal, regarding it as superstition. In his dialogue The Lover of Lies, he probably voices some of his own opinions through his character Tychiades, (Note: Tychiades is commonly identified as an authorial self-insertion, although Daniel Ogden notes that this can only be true to a limited extent.) perhaps including the declaration by Tychiades that he does not believe in daemones, phantoms, or ghosts because he has never seen such things. Tychiades, however, still professes belief in the gods' existence:

Dinomachus: 'In other words, you do not believe in the existence of the Gods, since you maintain that cures cannot be wrought by the use of holy names?'
Tychiades: 'Nay, say not so, my dear Dinomachus,' I answered; 'the Gods may exist, and these things may yet be lies. I respect the Gods: I see the cures performed by them, I see their beneficence at work in restoring the sick through the medium of the medical faculty and their drugs. Asclepius, and his sons after him, compounded soothing medicines and healed the sick, – without the lion's-skin-and-field-mouse process.'

According to Everett Ferguson, Lucian was strongly influenced by the Cynics. The Dream or the Cock, Timon the Misanthrope, Charon or Inspectors, and The Downward Journey or the Tyrant all display Cynic themes. Lucian was particularly indebted to Menippus, a Cynic philosopher and satirist of the third century BC. Lucian wrote an admiring biography of the philosopher Demonax, who was a philosophical eclectic, but whose ideology most closely resembled Cynicism. Demonax's main divergence from the Cynics was that he did not disapprove of ordinary life. Paul Turner observes that Lucian's Cynicus reads as a straightforward defense of Cynicism, but also remarks that Lucian savagely ridicules the Cynic philosopher Peregrinus in his Passing of Peregrinus.

Lucian also greatly admired Epicurus, whom he describes in Alexander the False Prophet as "truly holy and prophetic". Later, in the same dialogue, he praises a book written by Epicurus:

What blessings that book creates for its readers and what peace, tranquillity, and freedom it engenders in them, liberating them as it does from terrors and apparitions and portents, from vain hopes and extravagant cravings, developing in them intelligence and truth, and truly purifying their understanding, not with torches and squills [i. e. sea onions] and that sort of foolery, but with straight thinking, truthfulness and frankness.

Lucian had a generally negative opinion of Herodotus and his historiography, which he viewed as faulty.

== Works ==
Over eighty works attributed to Lucian have survived. These works belong to a diverse variety of styles and genres, and include comic dialogues, rhetorical essays, and prose fiction. Lucian's writings were targeted towards a highly educated, upper-class Greek audience and make almost constant allusions to Greek cultural history, leading the classical scholar R. Bracht Branham to label Lucian's highly sophisticated style "the comedy of tradition". By the time Lucian's writings were rediscovered during the Renaissance, most of the works of literature referenced in them had been lost or forgotten, making it difficult for readers of later periods to understand his works.

=== A True Story ===
Illustration from 1894 by William Strang depicting a battle scene from Book One of Lucian's novel A True Story

Lucian was one of the earliest novelists in Western civilization. In A True Story (Ἀληθῆ διηγήματα), a fictional narrative work written in prose, he parodies some of the fantastic tales told by Homer in the Odyssey and also the not-so-fantastic tales from the historian Thucydides. He anticipated modern science fiction themes including voyages to the moon and Venus, extraterrestrial life, interplanetary warfare, and artificial life, nearly two millennia before Jules Verne and H. G. Wells. The novel is often regarded as the earliest known work of science fiction.

The novel begins with an explanation that the story is not at all "true" and that everything in it is, in fact, a complete and utter lie. The narrative begins with Lucian and his fellow travelers journeying out past the Pillars of Heracles. Blown off course by a storm, they come to an island with a river of wine filled with fish and bears, a marker indicating that Heracles and Dionysus have traveled to this point, and trees that look like women. Shortly after leaving the island, they are caught up by a whirlwind and taken to the Moon, where they find themselves embroiled in a full-scale war between the king of the Moon and the king of the Sun over colonization of the Morning Star. Both armies include bizarre hybrid lifeforms. The armies of the Sun win the war by clouding over the Moon and blocking out the Sun's light. Both parties then come to a peace agreement. Lucian then describes life on the Moon and how it is different from life on Earth.

After returning to Earth, the adventurers are swallowed by a 200-mile-long whale, in whose belly they discover a variety of fish people, whom they wage war against and triumph over. They kill the whale by starting a bonfire and escape by propping its mouth open. Next, they encounter a sea of milk, an island of cheese, and the Island of the Blessed. There, Lucian meets the heroes of the Trojan War, other mythical men and animals, as well as Homer and Pythagoras. They find sinners being punished, the worst of them being the ones who had written books with lies and fantasies, including Herodotus and Ctesias. After leaving the Island of the Blessed, they deliver a letter to Calypso given to them by Odysseus explaining that he wishes he had stayed with her so he could have lived eternally. They then discover a chasm in the Ocean, but eventually sail around it, discover a far-off continent and decide to explore it. The book ends abruptly with Lucian stating that their future adventures will be described in the upcoming sequels, a promise which a disappointed scholiast described as "the biggest lie of all".

=== Satirical dialogues ===
In his Double Indictment, Lucian declares that his proudest literary achievement is the invention of the "satirical dialogue", which he modeled on the earlier Platonic dialogue, but made comedic in tone rather than philosophical. The prolaliai to his Dialogues of the Courtesans suggests that Lucian acted out his dialogues himself as part of a comedic routine. Lucian's Dialogues of the Dead (Νεκρικοὶ Διάλογοι) is a satirical work centering around the Cynic philosophers Diogenes and his pupil Menippus, who lived modestly while they were alive and are now living comfortably in the abysmal conditions of the Underworld, while those who had lived lives of luxury are in torment when faced by the same conditions. The dialogue draws on earlier literary precursors, including the nekyia in Book XI of Homer's Odyssey, but also adds new elements not found in them. Homer's nekyia describes transgressors against the gods being punished for their sins, but Lucian embellished this idea by having cruel and greedy persons also be punished.

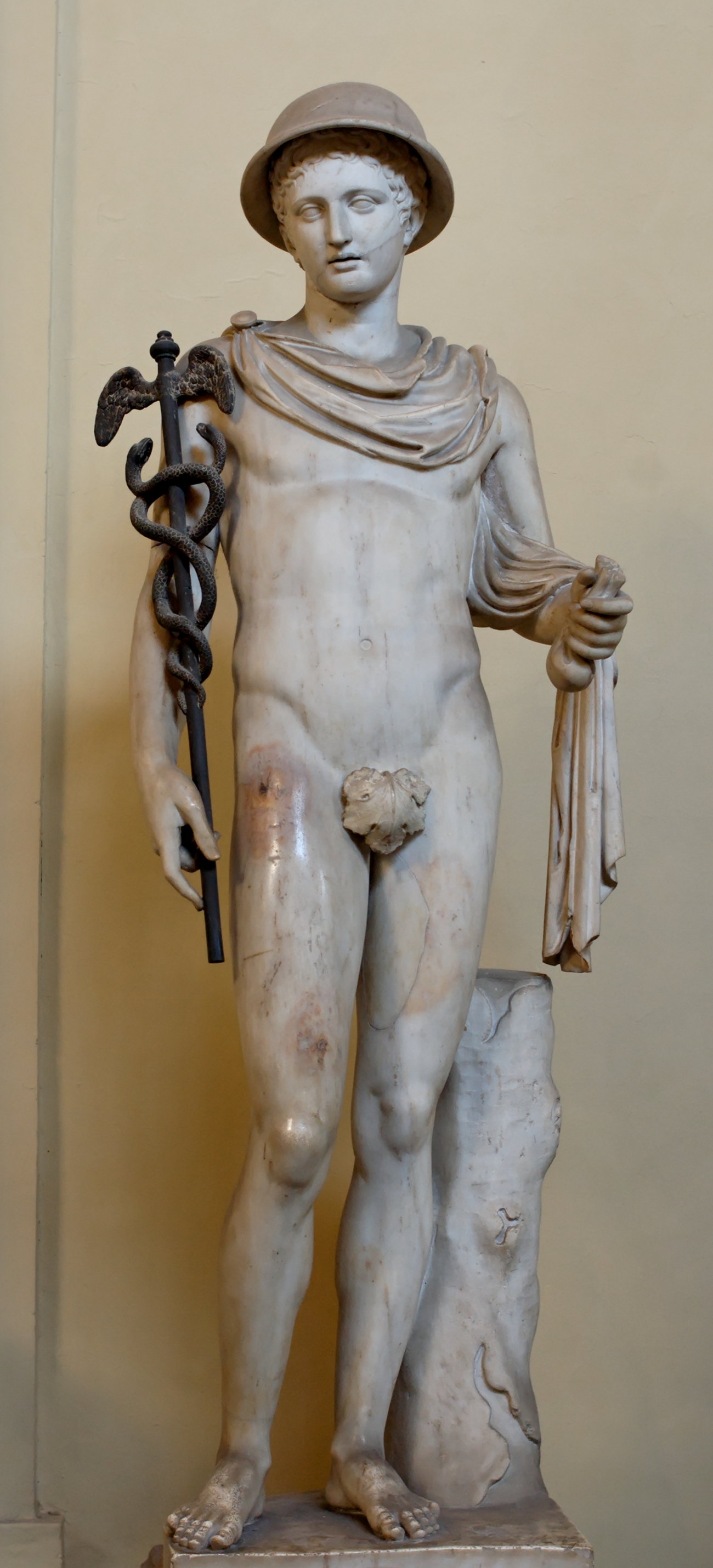
Hermes, the messenger of the gods, a major recurring character throughout many of Lucian's dialogues.

In his dialogue The Lover of Lies (Φιλοψευδὴς), Lucian satirizes belief in the supernatural and paranormal through a framing story in which the main narrator, a skeptic named Tychiades, goes to visit an elderly friend named Eukrates. At Eukrates's house, he encounters a large group of guests who have recently gathered together due to Eukrates suddenly falling ill. The other guests offer Eukrates a variety of folk remedies to help him recover. When Tychiades objects that such remedies do not work, the others all laugh at him and try to persuade him to believe in the supernatural by telling him stories, which grow increasingly ridiculous as the conversation progresses. One of the last stories they tell is "The Sorcerer's Apprentice", which the German playwright Goethe later adapted into a famous ballad.

Lucian frequently made fun of philosophers, sparing no school from his mockery. In the dialogue Philosophies for Sale, Lucian creates an imaginary slave-market in which Zeus puts famous philosophers up for sale, including Pythagoras, Diogenes, Heraclitus, Socrates, Chrysippus, and Pyrrho, each of whom attempts to persuade the customers to buy his philosophy. In The Banquet, or Lapiths, Lucian points out the hypocrisies of representatives from all the major philosophical schools. In The Fisherman, or the Dead Come to Life, Lucian defends his other dialogues by comparing the venerable philosophers of ancient times with their unworthy contemporary followers. Lucian was often particularly critical of people who pretended to be philosophers when they really were not, and his dialogue The Runaways portrays an imposter Cynic as the antithesis of true philosophy. In his Symposium, a parody of Plato's Symposium, instead of discussing the nature of love, philosophers get drunk, tell smutty tales, argue relentlessly over whose school is the best, and eventually break out into a full-scale brawl. In Icaromenippus, the Cynic philosopher Menippus fashions a set of wings for himself in imitation of the mythical Icarus and flies to Heaven, where he receives a guided tour from Zeus himself. Zeus announces his decision to destroy all philosophers, since all they do is bicker, though he agrees to grant them a temporary reprieve until spring. Nektyomanteia is a dialogue written in parallel to Icaromenippus in which, rather than flying to Heaven, Menippus descends to the underworld to consult the prophet Tiresias.

Lucian wrote numerous dialogues making fun of traditional Greek stories about the gods. His Dialogues of the Gods (Θεῶν Διάλογοι) consists of numerous short vignettes parodying a variety of scenes from Greek mythology. The dialogues portray the gods as comically weak and prone to all the foibles of human emotion. Zeus in particular is shown as a "feckless ruler" and as a serial adulterer. Lucian also wrote several other works in a similar vein, including Zeus Catechized, Zeus Rants, and The Parliament of the Gods. Throughout all his dialogues, Lucian displays a particular fascination with Hermes, the messenger of the gods, who frequently appears as a major character in the role of an intermediary who travels between worlds. The Dialogues of the Courtesans is a collection of short dialogues involving various courtesans. This collection is unique as one of the only surviving works of Greek literature to mention female homosexuality. It is also unusual for mixing Lucian's characters from other dialogues with stock characters from New Comedy; over half of the men mentioned in Dialogues of the Courtesans are also mentioned in Lucian's other dialogues, but almost all of the courtesans themselves are characters borrowed from the plays of Menander and of other comedic playwrights.

=== Treatises and letters ===
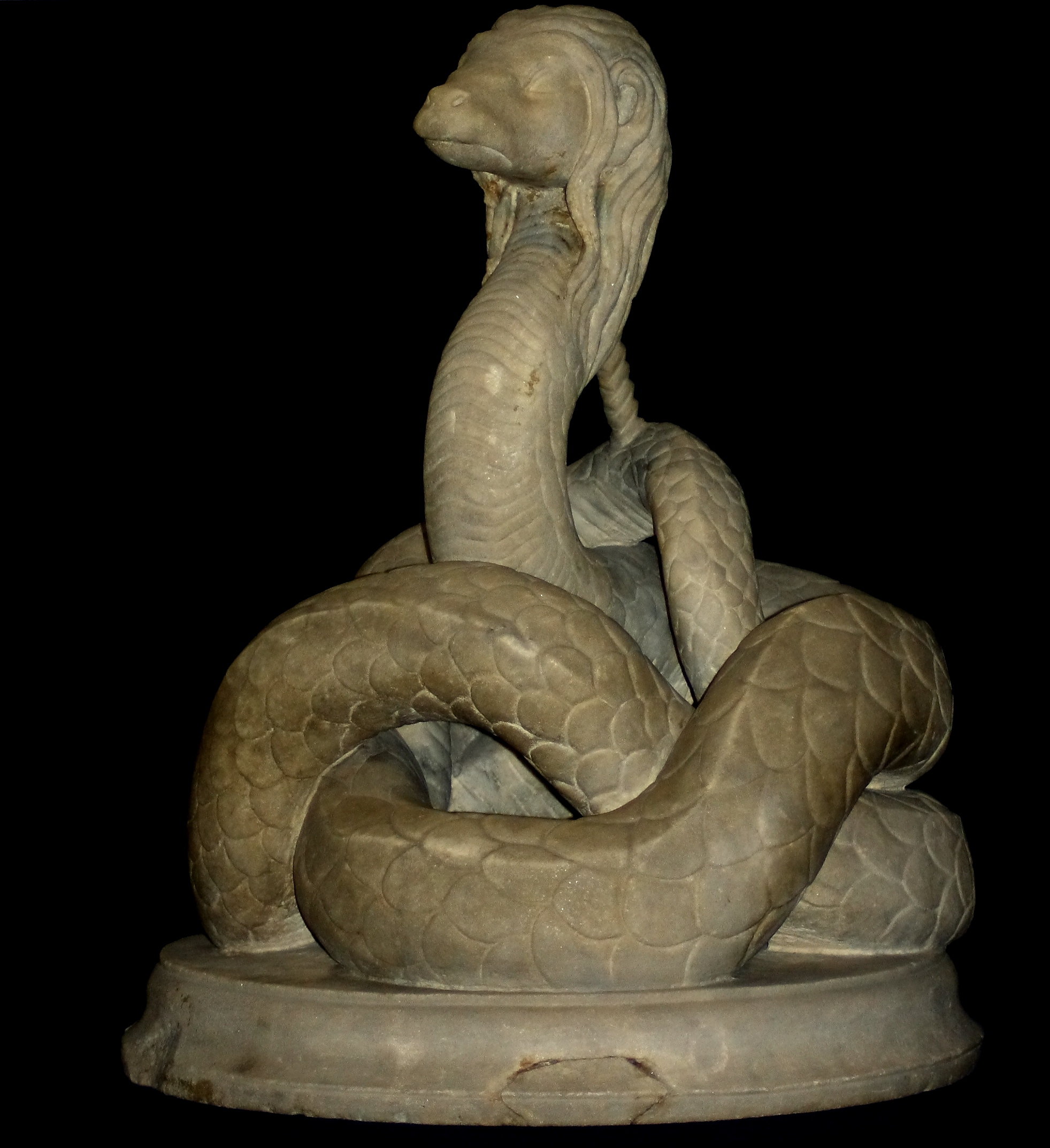
Statue of the snake-god Glycon, invented by the oraclemonger Alexander of Abonoteichus, whom Lucian satirizes in his treatise Alexander the False Prophet

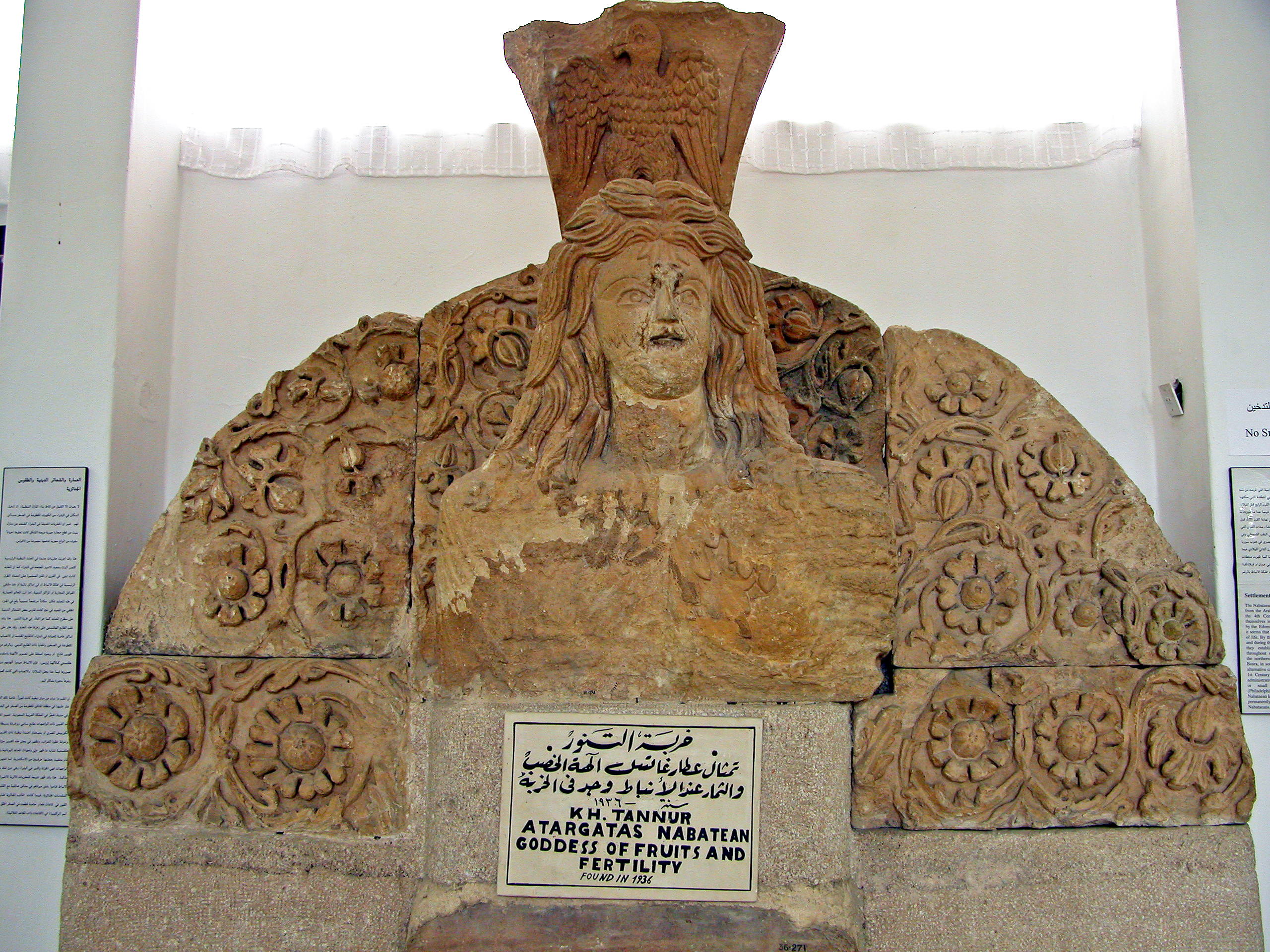
Nabataean carving from c. 100 AD depicting the goddess Atargatis, the subject of Lucian's treatise On the Syrian Goddess

Lucian's treatise Alexander the False Prophet describes the rise of Alexander of Abonoteichus, a charlatan who claimed to be the prophet of the serpent-god Glycon. Though the account is satirical in tone, it seems to be a largely accurate report of the Glycon cult and many of Lucian's statements about the cult have been confirmed through archaeological evidence, including coins, statues, and inscriptions. Lucian describes his own meeting with Alexander in which he posed as a friendly philosopher, but, when Alexander invited him to kiss his hand, Lucian bit it instead. Lucian reports that, aside from himself, the only others who dared challenge Alexander's reputation as a true prophet were the Epicureans (whom he lauds as heroes) and the Christians.

Lucian's treatise On the Syrian Goddess is a detailed description of the cult of the Syrian goddess Atargatis at Hierapolis (now Manbij). It is written in a faux-Ionic Greek and imitates the ethnographic methodology of the Greek historian Herodotus, which Lucian elsewhere derides as faulty. For generations, many scholars doubted the authenticity of On the Syrian Goddess because it seemed too genuinely reverent to have really been written by Lucian. More recently, scholars have come to recognize the book as satirical and have restored its Lucianic authorship.

In the treatise, Lucian satirizes the arbitrary cultural distinctions between "Greeks" and "Assyrians" by emphasizing the manner in which Syrians have adopted Greek customs and thereby effectively become "Greeks" themselves. The anonymous narrator of the treatise initially seems to be a Greek Sophist, but, as the treatise progresses, he reveals himself to actually be a native Syrian. Scholars dispute whether the treatise is an accurate description of Syrian cultural practices because very little is known about Hierapolis other than what is recorded in On the Syrian Goddess itself. Coins minted in the late fourth century BC, municipal decrees from Seleucid rulers, and a late Hellenistic relief carving have confirmed Lucian's statement that the city's original name was Manbog and that the city was closely associated with the cults of Atargatis and Hadad. A Jewish rabbi later listed the temple at Hierapolis as one of the five most important pagan temples in the Near East.

Macrobii ("Long-Livers") is an essay about famous philosophers who lived for many years. It describes how long each of them lived, and gives an account of each of their deaths. In his treatises Teacher of Rhetoric and On Salaried Posts, Lucian criticizes the teachings of master rhetoricians. His treatise On Dancing is a major source of information about Greco-Roman dance. In it, he describes dance as an act of mimesis ("imitation") and rationalizes the myth of Proteus as being nothing more than an account of a highly skilled Egyptian dancer. He also wrote about visual arts in Portraits and On Behalf of Portraits. Lucian's biography of the philosopher Demonax eulogizes him as a great philosopher and portrays him as a hero of parrhesia ("boldness of speech"). In his treatise, How to Write History, Lucian criticizes the historical methodology used by writers such as Herodotus and Ctesias, who wrote vivid and self-indulgent descriptions of events they had never actually seen. Instead, Lucian argues that the historian never embellish his stories and should place his commitment to accuracy above his desire to entertain his audience. He also argues the historian should remain absolutely impartial and tell the events as they really happened, even if they are likely to cause disapproval. Lucian names Thucydides as a specific example of a historian who models these virtues.

In his satirical letter Passing of Peregrinus (Περὶ τῆς Περεγρίνου Τελευτῆς), Lucian describes the death of the controversial Cynic philosopher Peregrinus Proteus, who had publicly immolated himself on a pyre at the Olympic Games of AD 165. The letter is historically significant because it preserves one of the earliest pagan evaluations of Christianity. In the letter, one of Lucian's characters delivers a speech ridiculing Christians for their perceived credulity and ignorance, but he also affords them some level of respect on account of their morality.

In the letter Against the Ignorant Book Collector, Lucian ridicules the common practice whereby Near Easterners collect massive libraries of Greek texts for the sake of appearing "cultured", but without actually reading any of them.

=== Pseudo-Lucian ===
Some of the writings attributed to Lucian, such as the Amores and the Ass, are usually not considered genuine works of Lucian and are normally cited under the name of "Pseudo-Lucian". The Ass (Λούκιος ἢ ῎Oνος) is probably a summarized version of a story by Lucian, and contains largely the same basic plot elements as The Golden Ass (or Metamorphoses) of Apuleius, but with fewer inset tales and a different ending. Amores is usually dated to the third or fourth centuries based on stylistic grounds.

== Legacy ==
=== Byzantine ===
Lucian is mentioned only sporadically between his death and the ninth century, even among pagan authors. The first author to mention him is Lactantius. He is made a character in the sixth-century letters of Aristaenetus. In the same century, portions of his On Slander were translated into Syriac as part of a monastic compendium. He was reassessed positively in the ninth century by the first generation of Byzantine humanists, such as Leo the Mathematician, Basil of Adada and Photios. In his Bibliotheca, Photios notes that Lucian "ridicules pagan things in almost all his texts", is never serious and never reveals his own opinion.

In the tenth century, Lucian was known in some circles as an anti-Christian writer, as seen in the works of Arethas of Caesarea and the Suda encyclopedia. The author of the Suda concludes that Lucian's soul is burning in Hell for his negative remarks about Christians in the Passing of Peregrinus. In general, however, the Byzantine reception of Lucian was positive. He was perhaps the only ancient author openly hostile to Christianity to be received positively by the Byzantines. He was regarded as not merely a pagan, but an atheist. Even so, "Lucian the atheist gave way to Lucian the master of style." From the eleventh century, he was a part of the school curriculum.

There was a "Lucianic revival" in the twelfth century. The preeminent Lucianic author of this period, who imitated Lucian's style in his own works, was Theodore Prodromos. In the Norman–Arab–Byzantine culture of twelfth-century Sicily, Lucian influenced the Greek authors Philagathus of Cerami and Eugenius of Palermo.

=== Renaissance and Reformation ===
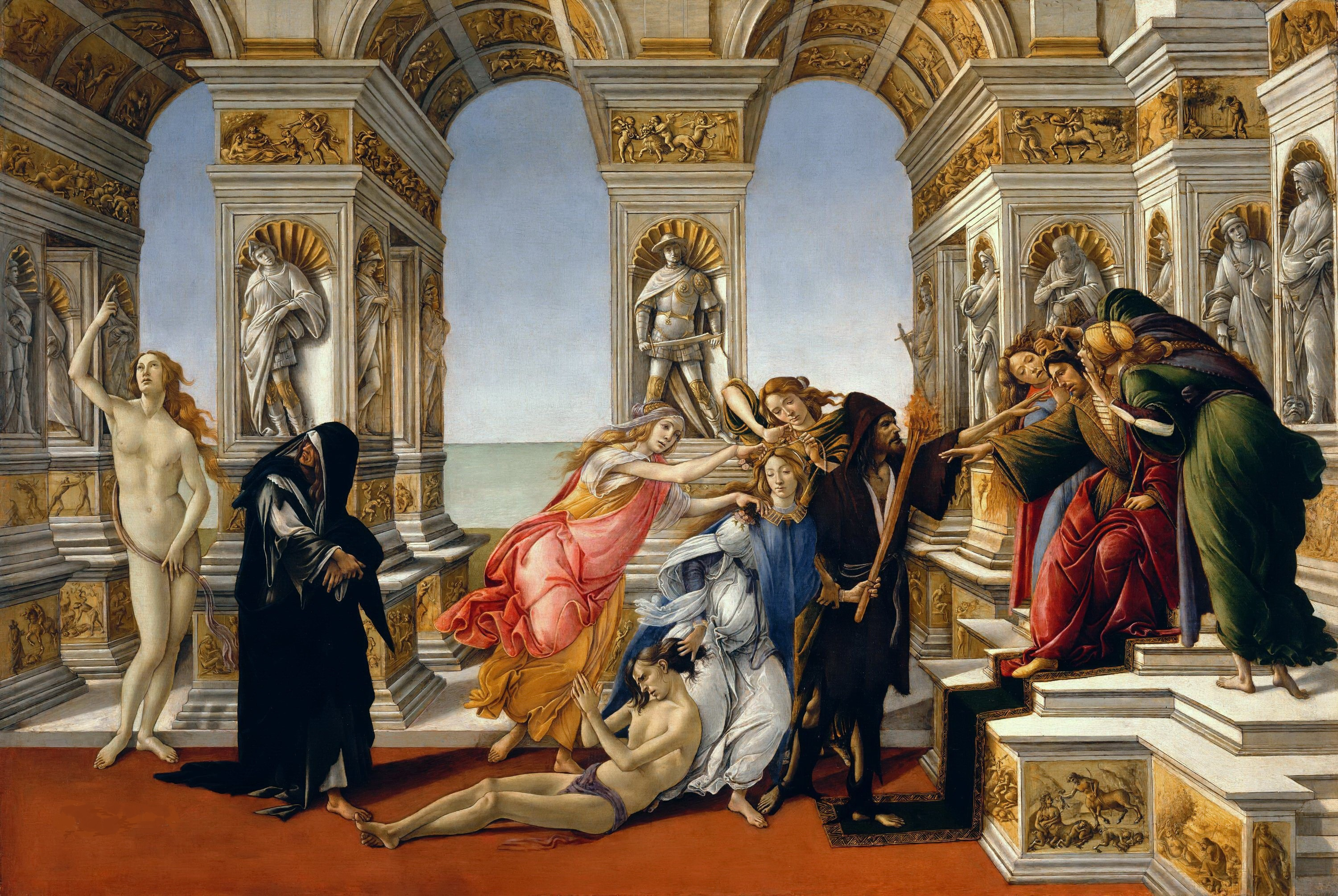
The Calumny of Apelles by Sandro Botticelli, based on a description of a painting by the Greek painter Apelles of Kos found in Lucian's ekphrasis On Calumny

In the West, Lucian's writings were mostly forgotten during the Middle Ages. When they were rediscovered in the West around 1400, they immediately became popular with the Renaissance humanists. By 1400, there were just as many Latin translations of the works of Lucian as there were for the writings of Plato and Plutarch. By ridiculing plutocracy as absurd, Lucian helped facilitate one of Renaissance humanism's most basic themes. His Dialogues of the Dead were especially popular and were widely used for moral instruction. As a result of this popularity, Lucian's writings had a profound influence on writers from the Renaissance and the Early Modern period.

Many early modern European writers adopted Lucian's lighthearted tone, his technique of relating a fantastic voyage through a familiar dialogue, and his trick of constructing proper names with deliberately humorous etymological meanings. During the Protestant Reformation, Lucian provided literary precedent for writers making fun of Catholic clergy. Desiderius Erasmus's Encomium Moriae (1509) displays Lucianic influences. Perhaps the most notable example of Lucian's impact in the fifteenth and sixteenth centuries was on the French writer François Rabelais, particularly in his set of five novels, Gargantua and Pantagruel, which was first published in 1532. Rabelais also is thought to be responsible for a primary introduction of Lucian to the French Renaissance and beyond through his translations of Lucian's works.

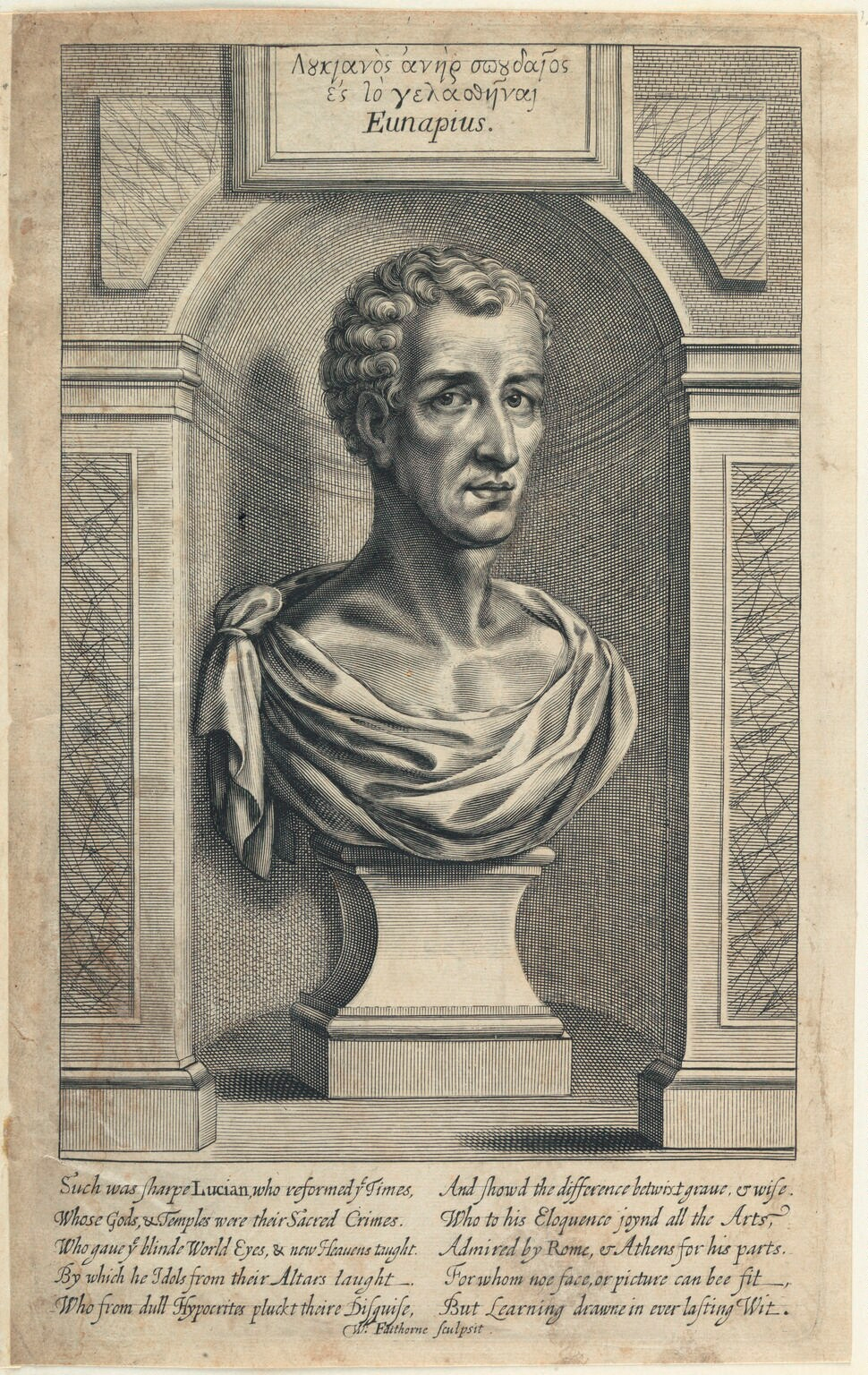
Speculative portrait by William Faithorne (1616/1691)

Lucian's True Story inspired both Sir Thomas More's Utopia (1516) and Jonathan Swift's Gulliver's Travels (1726). Sandro Botticelli's paintings The Calumny of Apelles and Pallas and the Centaur are both based on descriptions of paintings found in Lucian's works. Lucian's prose narrative Timon the Misanthrope was the inspiration for William Shakespeare's tragedy Timon of Athens and the scene from Hamlet with the gravediggers echoes several scenes from Dialogues of the Dead. Christopher Marlowe's famous verse "Was this the face that launched a thousand ships/And burnt the topless towers of Ilium?" is a paraphrase of Lucian:

ΕΡΜΗΣ: Τουτὶ τὸ κρανίον ἡ Ἑλένη ἐστίν.

ΜΕΝΙΠΠΟΣ: Εἶτα διὰ τοῦτο αἱ χίλιαι νῆες ἐπληρώθησαν ἐξ ἁπάσης τῆς Ἑλλάδος καὶ τοσοῦτοι ἔπεσον Ἕλληνές τε καὶ βάρβαροι καὶ τοσαῦται πόλεις ἀνάστατοι γεγόνασιν;

Hermes: This skull is Helen.

Menippos: And for this a thousand ships carried warriors from every part of Greece, Greeks and barbarians were slain, and cities made desolate?

— Lucian, Dialogues of the Dead, XVIII

Francis Bacon called Lucian a "contemplative atheist".

=== Early modern period ===
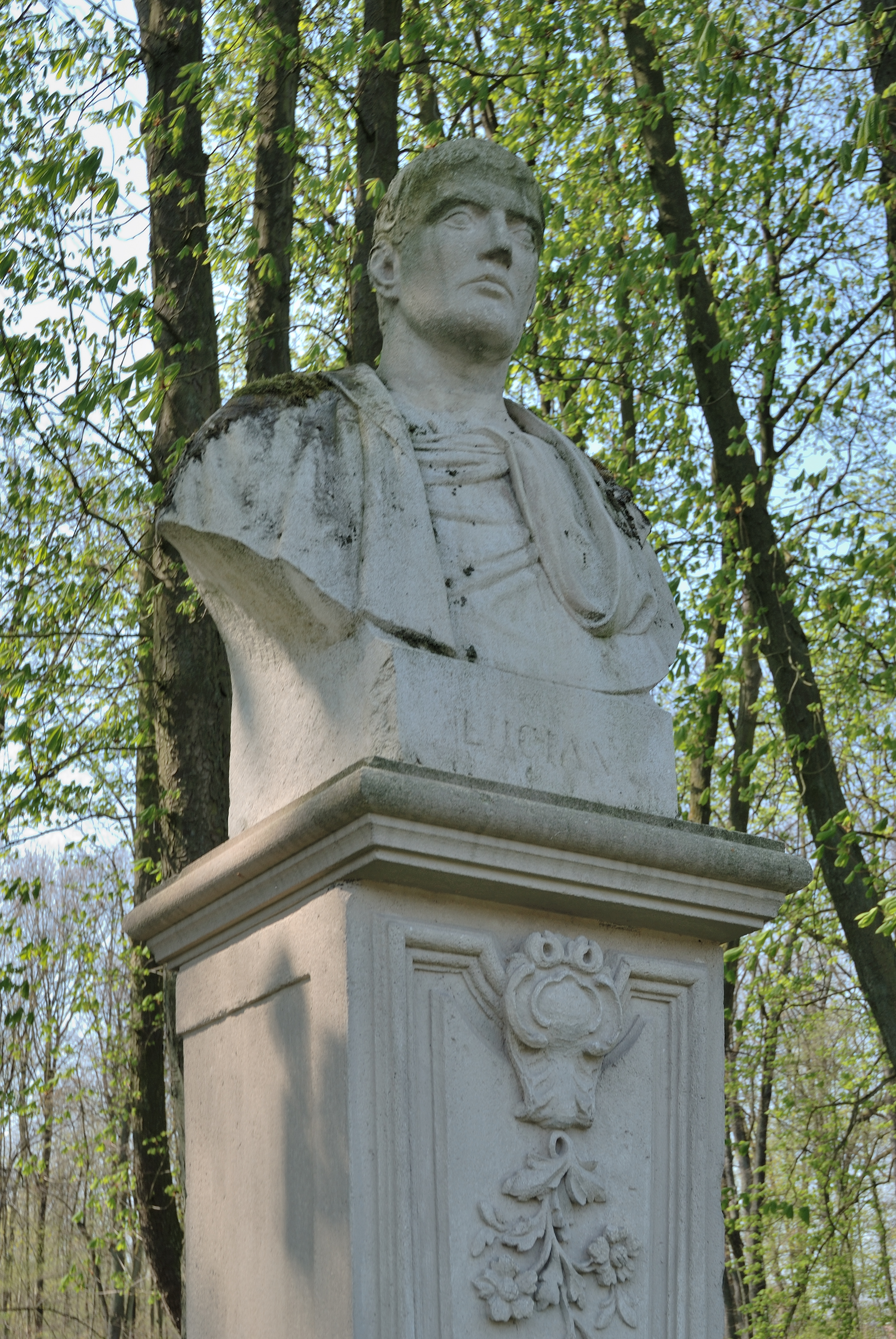
Monument commemorating Lucian of Samosata from Nordkirchen, Germany

Henry Fielding, the author of The History of Tom Jones, a Foundling (1749), owned a complete set of Lucian's writings in nine volumes. He deliberately imitated Lucian in his Journey from This World and into the Next and, in The Life and Death of Jonathan Wild, the Great (1743), he describes Lucian as "almost ... like the true father of humour" and lists him alongside Miguel de Cervantes and Jonathan Swift as a true master of satire. In The Convent Garden Journal, Fielding directly states in regard to Lucian that he had modeled his style "upon that very author". Nicolas Boileau-Despréaux, François Fénelon, Bernard Le Bovier de Fontenelle, and Voltaire all wrote adaptations of Lucian's Dialogues of the Dead. According to Turner, Voltaire's Candide (1759) displays the characteristically Lucianic theme of "refuting philosophical theory by reality". Voltaire also wrote The Conversation between Lucian, Erasmus and Rabelais in the Elysian Fields, a dialogue in which he treats Lucian as "one of his masters in the strategy of intellectual revolution".

Denis Diderot drew inspiration from the writings of Lucian in his Socrates Gone Mad; or, the Dialogues of Diogenes of Sinope (1770) and his Conversations in Elysium (1780). Lucian appears as one of two speakers in Diderot's dialogue Peregrinus Proteus (1791), which was based on The Passing of Peregrinus. Lucian's True Story inspired Cyrano de Bergerac, whose writings later served as inspiration for Jules Verne. The German satirist Christoph Martin Wieland was the first person to translate the complete works of Lucian into German and he spent his entire career adapting the ideas behind Lucian's writings for a contemporary German audience. David Hume admired Lucian as a "very moral writer" and quoted him with reverence when discussing ethics or religion. Hume read Lucian's Kataplous or Downward Journey when he was on his deathbed. Herman Melville references Lucian in Chapter 5 of The Confidence-Man, Book 26 of Pierre, and Chapter 13 of Israel Potter.

=== Modern period ===
Thomas Carlyle's epithet "Phallus-Worship", which he used to describe the contemporary literature of French writers such as Honoré de Balzac and George Sand, was inspired by his reading of Lucian. Kataplous, or Downward Journey also served as the source for Friedrich Nietzsche's concept of the Übermensch or Overman. Nietzsche declaration of a "new and super-human way of laughing – at the expense of everything serious!" echoes the exact wording of Tiresias's final advice to the eponymous hero of Lucian's dialogue Menippus: "Laugh a great deal and take nothing seriously." Professional philosophical writers since then have generally ignored Lucian, but Turner comments that "perhaps his spirit is still alive in those who, like Bertrand Russell, are prepared to flavor philosophy with wit."

Many 19th century and early 20th century classicists viewed Lucian's works negatively. The German classicist Eduard Norden admitted that he had, as a foolish youth, wasted time reading the works of Lucian, but, as an adult, had come to realize that Lucian was nothing more than an "Oriental without depth or character ... who has no soul and degrades the most soulful language". Rudolf Helm, one of the leading scholars on Lucian in the early twentieth century, labelled Lucian as a "thoughtless Syrian" who "possesses none of the soul of a tragedian" and compared him to the poet Heinrich Heine, who was known as the "mockingbird in the German poetry forest". In his 1906 publication Lukian und Menipp ("Lucian and Menippus"), Helm argued that Lucian's claims of generic originality, especially his claim of having invented the comic dialogue, were actually lies intended to cover up his almost complete dependence on Menippus, whom he argued was the true inventor of the genre.

Lucian's Syrian identity received renewed attention in the early twenty-first century as Lucian became seen as what Richter calls "a sort of Second Sophistic answer to early twenty-first-century questions about cultural and ethnic hybridity". Richter states that Postcolonial critics have come to embrace Lucian as "an early imperial paradigm of the 'ethno-cultural hybrid.'"

== Editions ==
- The Works of Lucian From the Greek (4 Vols.). Translated by Francklin, Thomas. London: T[homas] Cadell. 1780–1781. OCLC 642640554 (all editions).
1. Vol. 1. 1780.
  1. Via Google Books (NYPL).
  2. Via Internet Archive (UCLA).
2. Vol. 2. 1780.
  1. Via Google Books (Michigan).
  2. Via Internet Archive (UCLA).
3. Vol. 3. 1781.
  1. Via Google Books (Michigan).
  2. Via Internet Archive (UCLA).
4. Vol. 4. 1781.
  1. Via Google Books (Cal Berkeley).
  2. Via Google Books (British Library).
  3. Via Internet Archive (British Library).
- Lucian of Samosata from the Greek with the Comments and Illustrations of WIELAND and Others. Vol. I. Translated by Tooke, William. London: Longman, Hurst, Rees, Orme, and Brown. 1820 – via Internet Archive.; volume II.
- Lucian's True History, with illustrations by Aubrey Beardsley, William Strang, and J. B. Clark, privately printed in an edition of 251 copies, 1894.
- Lucian (1905). The Works of Lucian of Samosata – Complete With Exceptions Specified in the Preface (4 Vols.). Translated by Fowler, Henry Watson; Fowler, Francis George. Oxford: The Clarendon Press. LCCN 06-1045.
1. Vol. 1 – via HathiTrust (Michigan).
2. Vol. 2 – via Internet Archive (University of Toronto).
3. Vol. 3 – via Internet Archive (University of Toronto).
4. Vol. 4 – via Internet Archive (University of Toronto).
- Harmon, Austin Morris, ed. (1905). Lucian [of Samosata] – With an English Translation by A. M. Harmon of Yale University (8 Vols.). Vol. 6 translated by Kenneth Kilburn (1921–2012); Vols. 7–8 translated by Matthew Donald Macleod (1922–2010). Cambridge: Harvard University Press. London: William Heinemann. New York: Macmillan. LCCN 13-5615; NCID BA28080203 (8 Vol. series), NCID BA00254115 (parent bibliography); OCLC 7623348 (all editions).
1. Translation by Austin Morris Harmon (1878–1950). London: William Heinemann Ltd. New York: Macmillan.
2. Vol. 1. Series: Loeb Classical Library No. 14. 1913 – via Google Books (UC Berkeley). ISBN 978-0-6749-9015-9, 0-6749-9015-3 (American ISBN), ISBN 0-4349-9014-0 (British ISBN).
3. Translation by Austin Morris Harmon (1878–1950). London: William Heinemann Ltd. Cambridge: Harvard University Press.
4. Vol. 2. Series: Loeb Classical Library No. 54. 1960 [first printed 1915; re-printed 1919, 1929, 1953, 1960] – via Internet Archive (University of Toronto). ISBN 978-0-6749-9474-4, 0-6749-9474-4.
5. Vol. 3. Series: Loeb Classical Library No. 130. 1960 [first printed 1921, re-printed 1947, 1960] – via Internet Archive (University of Toronto). ISBN 978-0-6749-9333-4, 0-6749-9333-0.
6. Vol. 4. Series: Loeb Classical Library No. 162. 1961 [first printed 1925; re-printed 1953, 1961] – via Internet Archive (University of Toronto). ISBN 978-0-6749-9179-8, 0-6749-9179-6.
7. Vol. 5. Series: Loeb Classical Library No. 302. 1962 [first printed 1936; re-printed 1955, 1962] – via Internet Archive (University of Toronto). ISBN 978-0-6749-9144-6, 0-6749-9144-3, ISBN 978-0-4349-9302-4, 0-4349-9302-6 (hardcover), ISBN 978-0-6749-9333-4, 0-6749-9333-0 (hardcover).
8. Translation by Kenneth Kilburn (1921–2012). London: William Heinemann Ltd. Cambridge: Harvard University Press.
9. Vol. 6. Series: Loeb Classical Library, No. 430. 1959 – via Internet Archive (Michigan). ISBN 978-0-6749-9060-9, 0-6749-9060-9.
10. Vol. 7. Series: Loeb Classical Library No. 431. 1961 – via Internet Archive (University of Toronto). ISBN 978-0-6749-9475-1, 0-6749-9475-2.
11. Translation by Matthew Donald Macleod (1922–2010). Cambridge and London: Harvard University Press.
12. Vol. 8. Series: Loeb Classical Library No. 432. 2001 [first printed 1967; re-printed 1979, 1993, 2001] – via Internet Archive. ISBN 978-0-6749-9476-8, 0-6749-9476-0, ISBN 0-6749-9476-0; ISBN 0-4349-9432-4.
- Neil Hopkinson (ed.), Lucian: A Selection. Cambridge Greek and Latin Texts (Cambridge/New York: Cambridge University Press, 2008).
- Lightfoot, Jane (2003). On the Syrian Goddess. Oxford University Press. ISBN 978-0-19-925138-4.
- Selected Satires Of Lucian (1962) Translated and Edited by Lionel Casson Transaction Publishers Rutgers University ISBN 978-0-202-36192-5
