= Cerami (surname) =

Cerami is a surname. Notable people with the surname include:

- Anthony Cerami (born 1940), American entrepreneur and research scientist
- Pino Cerami (1922–2014), Belgian road bicycle racer
- Vincenzo Cerami (1940–2013), Italian screenwriter, novelist and poet

== See also ==
- Philagathus of Cerami, 12th century monk and preacher
