= Atargatis =

Ancient goddess of Northern Syria

- fertility, water goddess and femininity goddess
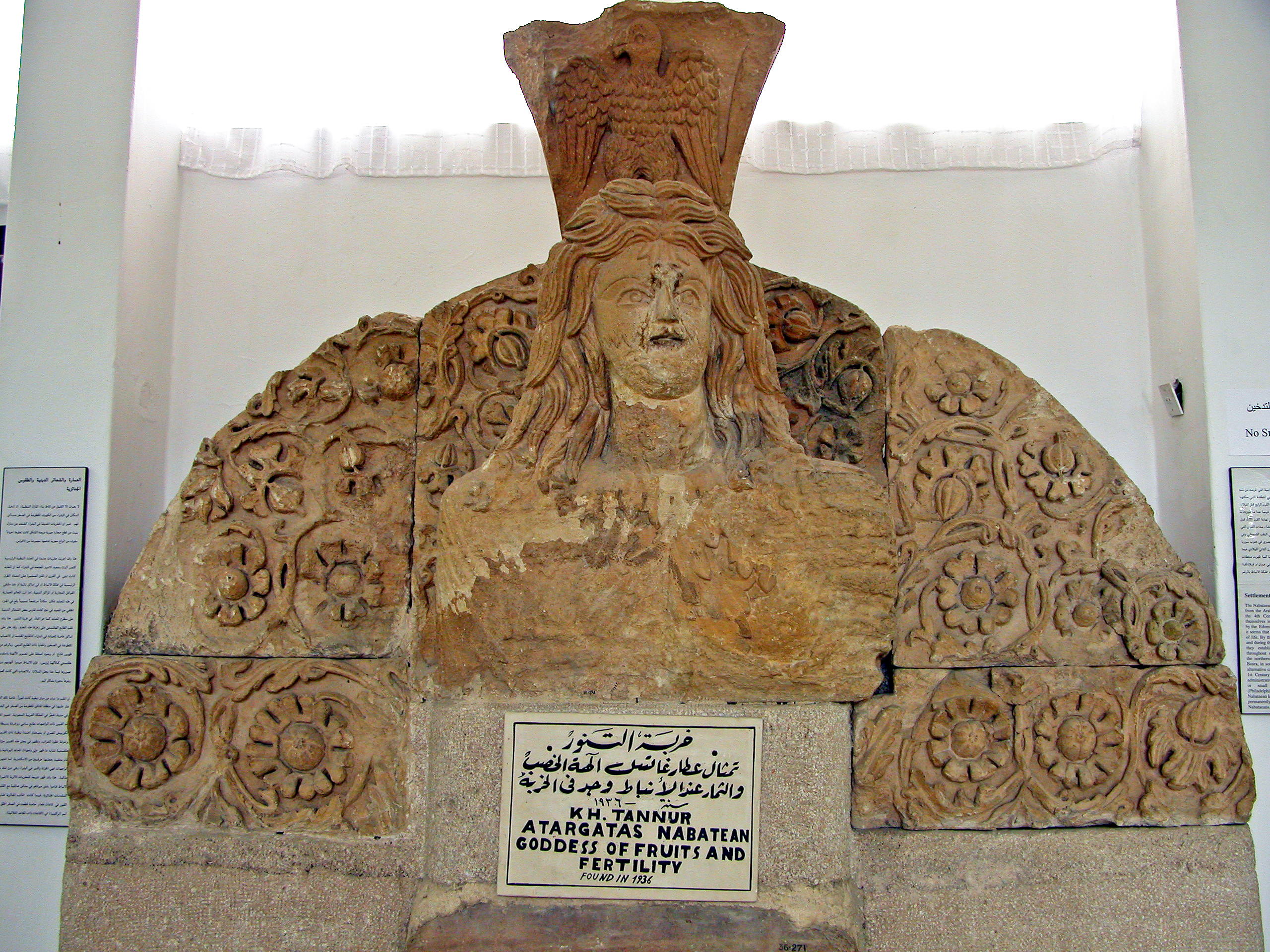
- A Nabataean depiction of the goddess Atargatis dating from sometime around 100 AD, currently housed in the Jordan Archaeological Museum
- Major cult center: Hierapolis Bambyce
- Symbols: dove, fish
- Consort: Hadad

Equivalents
- Canaanite: Astarte
- Greek: Aphrodite
- Roman: Dea Syria, Venus

Atargatis (known as Derceto by the Greeks) was the chief goddess of northern Syria in classical antiquity. Primarily she was a fertility goddess, but, as the baalat ("mistress") of her city and people she was also responsible for their protection and well-being. Her chief sanctuary was at Hierapolis, modern Manbij, northeast of Aleppo, Syria.

Michael Rostovtzeff called her "the great mistress of the North Syrian lands". Her consort is usually Hadad. As Ataratheh, doves and fish were considered sacred to her: doves as an emblem of the love goddess, and fish as symbolic of the fertility and life of the waters.

According to a third-century Syriac source, "In Syria and in Urhâi [Edessa] the men used to castrate themselves in honor of Taratha. But when King Abgar became a [Christian] believer, he commanded that anyone who emasculated himself should have a hand cut off. And from that day to the present no one in Urhâi emasculates himself anymore".

She is sometimes described as a mermaid-goddess, due to her identification with a fish-bodied goddess at Ashkelon.

== Origin and name ==
Atargatis is seen as a continuation of Bronze Age goddesses. At Ugarit, cuneiform tablets attest multiple Canaanite goddesses, among them three are considered as relevant to theories about the origin of Atargatis:

- ʾAṯirat, described as "Lady of the Sea" (rbt ảṯrt ym) and "mother of the gods" (qnyt ỉlm)
- ʿAnat, a war goddess
- ʿAṯtart, a goddess of the hunt also sharing Anat's warlike role, regarded as analogous to Ishtar and Ishara in Ugaritic god lists and as such possibly connected to love

John Day asserts that all three shared many traits with each other and may have been worshipped in conjunction or separately during 1500 years of cultural history. While the worship of Ashtart and Anat as a pair is well attested, Steve A. Wiggins found no evidence Ashtart was ever conflated with Athirat. He also pointed out that the concept of Athirat, Anat and Ashtart as a trinity of sorts (popularized by authors like Tikva Frymer-Kensky), is modern and ignores the role of other deities in Ugarit - for example Shapash; as well as the importance of the connection between Athirat and El.

The original Aramaic name of the goddess was 𐡏𐡕𐡓𐡏𐡕𐡄 (ʿAttarʿattā), with its other forms including 𐡏𐡕𐡓𐡏𐡕𐡀 (ʿAttarʿattaʾ), 𐡀𐡕𐡓𐡏𐡕𐡄 (ʾAttarʿattā), 𐡀𐡕𐡓𐡏𐡕𐡀 (ʾAttarʿattaʾ), and the apocope form 𐡕𐡓𐡏𐡕 (Tarʿatta). The name ʿAttarʿattā was composed of:

- 𐡏𐡕𐡓 (ʿAttar, from earlier ʿAṯtar), which during the Iron Age had evolved from being the name of the goddess ʿAṯtart to become used to mean "goddess" in general, and was used in the name ʿAttarʿattā in the sense of "goddess";
- and 𐡏𐡕𐡄 (ʿAttā), which is the Aramaic variant of the name of the Semitic goddess ʿAnat.

The Greek name of the goddess, attested in the forms Αταργατις (Atargatis), Ατταγαθη (Attagathē), Αταρατη (Ataratē), and Αταργατη (Atargatē), was derived from the non-apocope forms of its original Aramaic name, while her Greek name Δερκετω (Derketō) was derived from 𐡕𐡓𐡏𐡕 (Tarʿatta).

== Classical period ==
Various Greek and Latin writers have written about the goddess Atargatis or Derketo.

Atargatis generally appears as the wife of Hadad. They are the protecting deities of the community. (Note: Cf., the Tyche of the city.) Atargatis, wearing a mural crown, is the ancestor the royal house, the founder of social and religious life, the goddess of generation and fertility (hence the prevalence of phallic emblems), and the inventor of useful appliances.

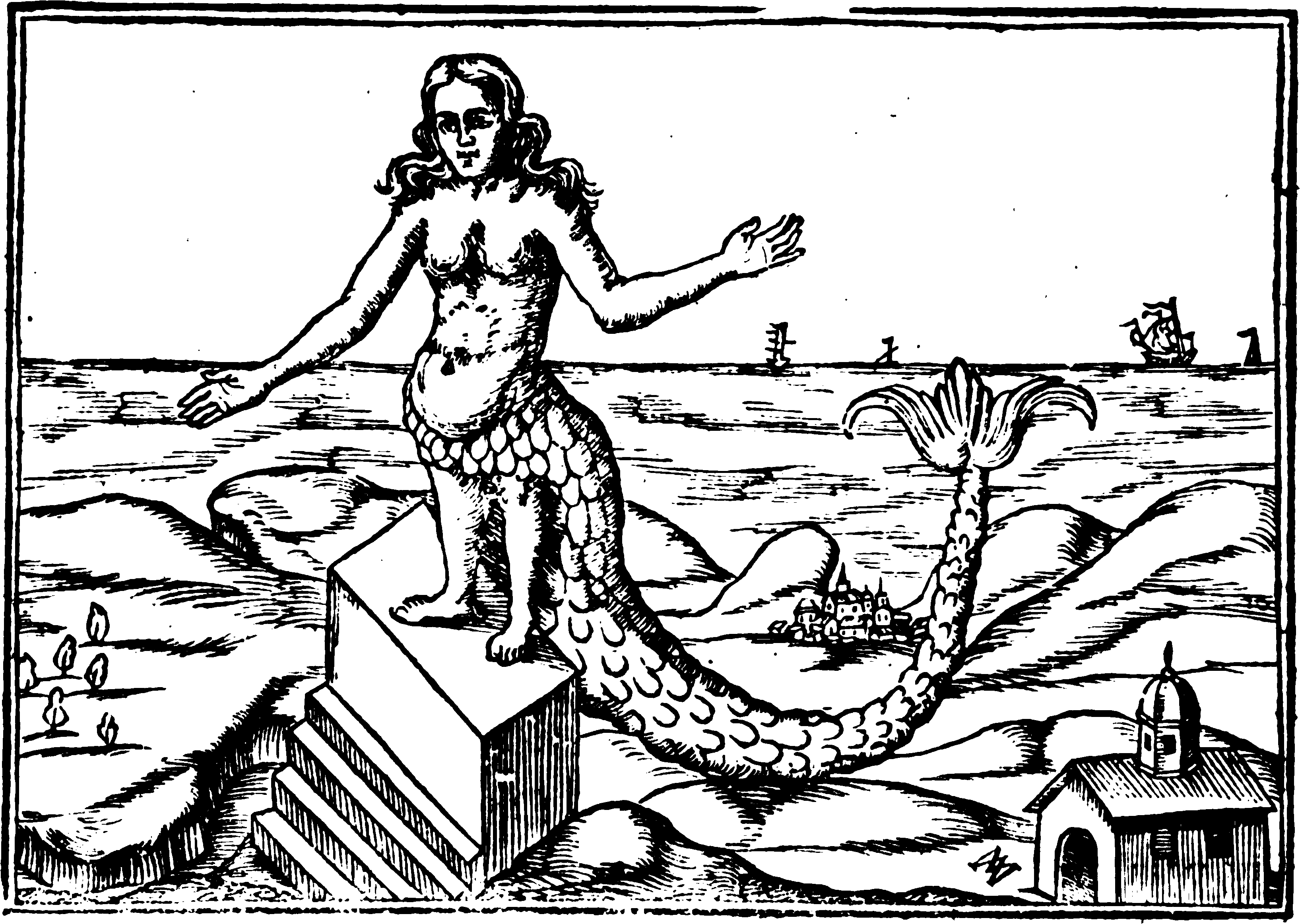
Derceto, from Athanasius Kircher's Oedipus Aegyptiacus, 1652.

Derceto was venerated in mermaid form, i.e., with "a face of a woman, and otherwise the entire body of a fish" in a shrine by Ashkelon, Syria, according to Diodorus (1st century BCE), drawing on Ctesias (5th century BCE); the attached myth explaining that Derceto transformed into a fish, after drowning herself in a nearby lake. (Note: The full myth is that Derceto drowned herself in a lake near Ashkelon, in shame, after giving birth to a daughter Semiramis in an illicit love affair with a youth named Simios. See §Mythology, infra.) The goddess was presumably revered in that fish-form at Ashkelon. It has been conjectured that the veneration of the goddess did indeed occur at Ashkelon and may have originated there. However, there is no evidence that Atargatis was worshipped at Ascalon.

The image of Derceto as half-woman half-fish was also witnessed by Lucian (2nd century) somewhere in Phoenicia (i.e., Phoenice Syria), but at the Holy City of Phoenicia (Hierapolis Bambyce), she was depicted entirely as a woman. This temple was nominally dedicated to "Hera", but some thought it actually consecrated Derceto. (Note: Lucian. De Dea Syria 14; Lightfoot ed. (2003), pp. 254–255 (text); 352–356 (commentary); 352–356 (fish imagery). Cited and translation quoted by Hasan-Rokem (2014), p. 182.) Lucian in a later passage gives a description at length of this "Hera" whom the locals "call by a different name" (Atargatis), at Hierapolis. (Note: "Hera" is just the tentative Greek designation Lucian used for this goddess, which must be Atargatis, but he was wavering on his decision, because aspects of many Greek goddesses were exhibited, in his words, those of "Athena and Aphrodite and Selene and Rhea and Artemis and Nemesis and the Fates".) The goddess was posed seated with two lions on her sides, (Note: And at her side was "Zeus", with a bull beneath him.) "In one hand she had a scepter, in the other a spindle, and on her head she wears rays, a tower [mural crown]..", and she wore a girdle (Ancient Greek: κεστός) as well. The head was set with a gemstone called lychnis which glowed by night.

The worship of Atargatis going back to the Hellenistic Phoenicia (Seleucid Syria) is evidenced by inscriptions at Akko.

== Iconography ==
The literary attestations as already given are that Derceto was depicted as fish-tailed goddess at Ashkelon (by Ctesias after Diodorus), and later at Hieropolis (by Lucian).

But all of the extant iconography of the Syriac goddess catalogued in the LIMC shows her as anthropomorphic. But the "fish-goddess form of Atargatis" were among the finds unearthed in the Transjordan, or so Glueck (cf. infra) has insisted, though only her forms as goddess of "foliage and fruits" or cereal goddess were published in his paper.

=== Numismatics ===
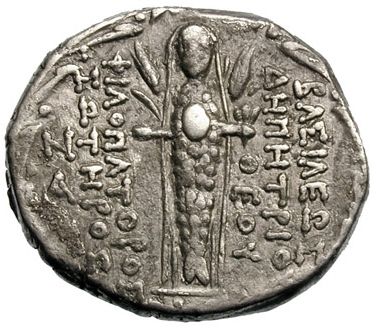
The reverse of a coin of Demetrius III, depicts fish-bodied Atargatis, veiled, holding the egg (cf. birth of Syrian Venus from egg, §Mythology ) flanked by barley stalks.

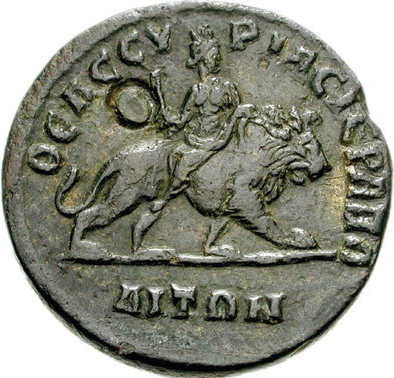
The reverse of a coin from Cyrrhestica depicts Atargatis riding a lion, wearing a mural crown, and holding a sceptre.

The tetradrachm issued under Demetrius III Eucaerus (96–87 BCE, coin image above) shows a fish-bodied figure on the reverse side, which scholarship identifies as Stargateis. (Note: The inscription " BAΣIΛEΩS / DHMHTPIOY / ΘEOY - ΦIΛOΠATOPOΣ / ΣΩTHPOΣ" refers to the monarch, but does not label the goddess as such.) The cult statues of Stargateis and her consort Hadad were commonly employed on as the motif on the reverse of tetradrachm coinage by this monarch and by Antiochus XII Dionysus (87– 84 BCE) who succeeded him.

Hieropolis Bambyce was one of the cities which minted its own coins. And some of the Hieropolitan coinage portray "Atargatis as indeed seated between lions and holds a scepter in her right hand and probably a spindle in her left", just as Lucian had described. Palmyra coinage also depicts a Tyche on the obverse and strolling lion on the reverse; one coin also depicts a goddess mounted on a lion, and the lion symbolism suggest that Atargatis is being represented.

Coinage of Palmyra, some of which were found in the Palmyrene colony at Dura-Europos, may depict the goddess. The coin with Tyche on the obverse and a strolling lion on the reverse, and one with a goddess riding a lion points to Atargatis, based on the lion motif. (Note: A crescent moon may be depicted on the coin, together with the goddess. A crescent surmounted on a lead standard ʾAin Djudj has been commented on as possibly symbolizing Stargateis in the guise of moon goddess Selene, one of the many mentioned by Lucian as her analog.) There has also been found one Palmyrene tessera (token) inscribed with Atargatis's name (Aramaic: ʿtrʿth).

=== Sculptures ===
A relief fragment found at Dura-Europos is thought to represent Atargatis/Tyche (Yale-French excavations, 1935–46), as it shows a pair of doves that are sacred to Atargatis besides her head; the doves are assumed to be perched on the post of her throne, which is missing. The figure's mural crown is emblematic of a Tyche (protector-goddess) of a city, but this matches the historic account that the cult relief Atargatis Hierapolis was seen wearing a mural crown.

In the temples of Atargatis at Palmyra and at Dura-Europos (Note: The goddess at Dura-Europos represented in the guise of the Tyche of Palmyra, accompanied by the lion, in a fresco from the sanctuary of the Palmyrene gods, removed to the Yale Art Gallery.) she appeared repeatedly with her consort, Hadad, and in the richly syncretic religious culture at Dura-Europos, was worshipped as Artemis Azzanathkona.

In the 1930s, numerous Nabatean bas-relief busts of Atargatis were identified by Nelson Glueck at Khirbet et-Tannûr, Jordan, in temple ruins of the early first century CE; there the lightly veiled goddess's lips and eyes had once been painted red, and a pair of fish confronted one another above her head. Her wavy hair, suggesting water to Glueck, was parted in the middle. At Petra the goddess from the north was syncretised with a North Arabian goddess from the south al-Uzzah, worshipped in the one temple. At Dura-Europus among the attributes of Atargatis are the spindle and the sceptre or fish-spear.

== Mythology ==
The legends are numerous and of an astrological character. A rationale for the Syrian dove-worship and abstinence from fish is seen in the story in Athenaeus 8.37, where Atargatis is naively explained to mean "without Gatis", the name of a queen who is said to have forbidden the eating of fish.

Diodorus Siculus (2.4.2), quoting Ctesius of Cnidus, tells how Derceto fell in love with a beautiful youth named Simios (also Ichthys, meaning 'fish') and bore a daughter but becoming ashamed of the illicit love, Derceto flung herself into a lake near Ashkelon and her body was changed into the form of a fish though her head remained human. In Diodorus's version of the legend, Derceto also despised the child from this union and had exposed the daughter to the desert, where she was raised by doves. This child grew up to be Semiramis, the legendary Assyrian queen. Lucian also notes that the erection of the temple at Hieropolis was ascribed by some to Semiramis who dedicated it to her mother Derceto.

=== Analysis ===
Ctesias's account, according to one analysis, is composed of two myths, the Derceto transformation myth, and the Semiramis birth myth, (Note: As a further layer, the goddess in both parts is equated to Astarte in W. Robertson Smith's analysis.) and a telling of each myth are told by a number of classical writers.

The first myth (the Derceto metamorphosis into fish) is told, e.g., by Ovid as a Dione-Cupid myth. The irony is that even though Ovid explicitly mentions Derceto (Latin: Derceti) of Babylonia transforming into a fish, (Note: Ovid also mentions Venus transforming into a fish. Metamorphoses V: 331, "Pisce Venus latuit..") Ovid's version of this first myth (detailed below) is recorded in Fasti, and fails to mention the goddess in Syria (Dione) metamorphosing into fish-shape. The metamorphosis thereafter needs be reconstructed by consulting other sources which preserves that original ending.

The second myth (the Semiramis birth myth) is told by various writers as an alternate version of the birth of Venus (from an egg carried ashore by fish, then hatched by doves), however, Ctesias felt compelled to "drop" the egg element according to the analysis. This seemed a gratuitous ("incredible") excision to the analyst, given that Venus's birth from an ocean-found egg was not a far cry from the familiar version of the Aphrodite/Venus's genesis out of water (sea-foam). (Note: Cf. "Dione from the foam" (signifying Venus) in Pervigilium Veneris.)

=== Syrian Venus ===
Ovid in Fasti recounts the legend that the goddess Dione accompanied by Cupid/Eros plunged into the river in Mesopotamia (Euphrates), whereby a pair of fish came to convey them through water to aid her escape from Typhon. The fish pair was commemorated as the constellation Pisces of the zodiac, and local Syrians abstain from eating fish on account of it. Menander and others (Note: Caesar Domitianus, Diognetus Erythræus) also relate this legend, and some of the versions, say that the goddess and Cupid subsequently transformed into fish, possibly preserving the original telling.

The name Dione could refer to Aphrodite's mother, but it was also an epithet of Aphrodite/Venus herself. So the legend has also been told as one of Venus with Cupid casting herself into the Euphrates, then transforming into fish.

The second myth describes the birth of Syrian Venus as originating in an egg that fell into the Euphrates, rolled onto land by fish, was hatched in the clutches of doves (scholia to Germanicus's Aratus; Hyginus, Fabulae). (Note: What W. R. Smith regards as myth "II." is just a variant of the Venus-Cupid myth (Smith's "I") in Cowper's estimation.)

The author of Catasterismi explained the constellation of Piscis Austrinus as the parent of the two fish making up the constellation of Pisces; according to that account, it was placed in the heavens in memory of Derceto's fall into the lake at Hierapolis Bambyce near the Euphrates in Syria, from which she was saved by a large fish — which again is intended to explain the Syrian abstinence from fish.

=== Syncretism ===
In many cases Atargatis, 'Ashtart, and other goddesses who once had independent cults and mythologies became fused to such an extent as to be indistinguishable. This fusion is exemplified by the temple at Carnion (Carnaim), which is probably identical with the famous temple of 'Ashtart at Ashtaroth-Karnaim.

Not unnaturally she is identified with the Greek Aphrodite. By the conjunction of her many functions (as fertility goddess and of appliances), (Note: Cf. supra) she becomes ultimately a great nature-goddess analogous to Cybele and Rhea, despite originating as a sea deity analogous to Amphitrite. In one aspect she typifies the protection of water in producing life; in another, the universal of other-earth; in a third (influenced, no doubt, by Chaldean astrology), the power of Destiny. She was also identified with Hera by Lucian in his De Dea Syria.

As a consequence of the first half of the name, Atargatis has frequently, though wrongly, been identified as Ashtart. The two deities were probably of common origin and have many features in common, but their cults are historically distinct. There is reference in 2 Maccabees 12.26 and 1 Maccabees 5:43 to an Atargateion or Atergateion, a temple of Atargatis, at Carnion in Gilead, but the home of the goddess was unquestionably not Israel or Canaan, but Syria itself; at Hierapolis Bambyce she had a temple in her name.

A recent analysis of the cult of Atargatis is an essay by Per Bilde, in which Atargatis appears in the context of other Hellenized Great Goddesses of the East.

== Cult ==
=== Temples ===
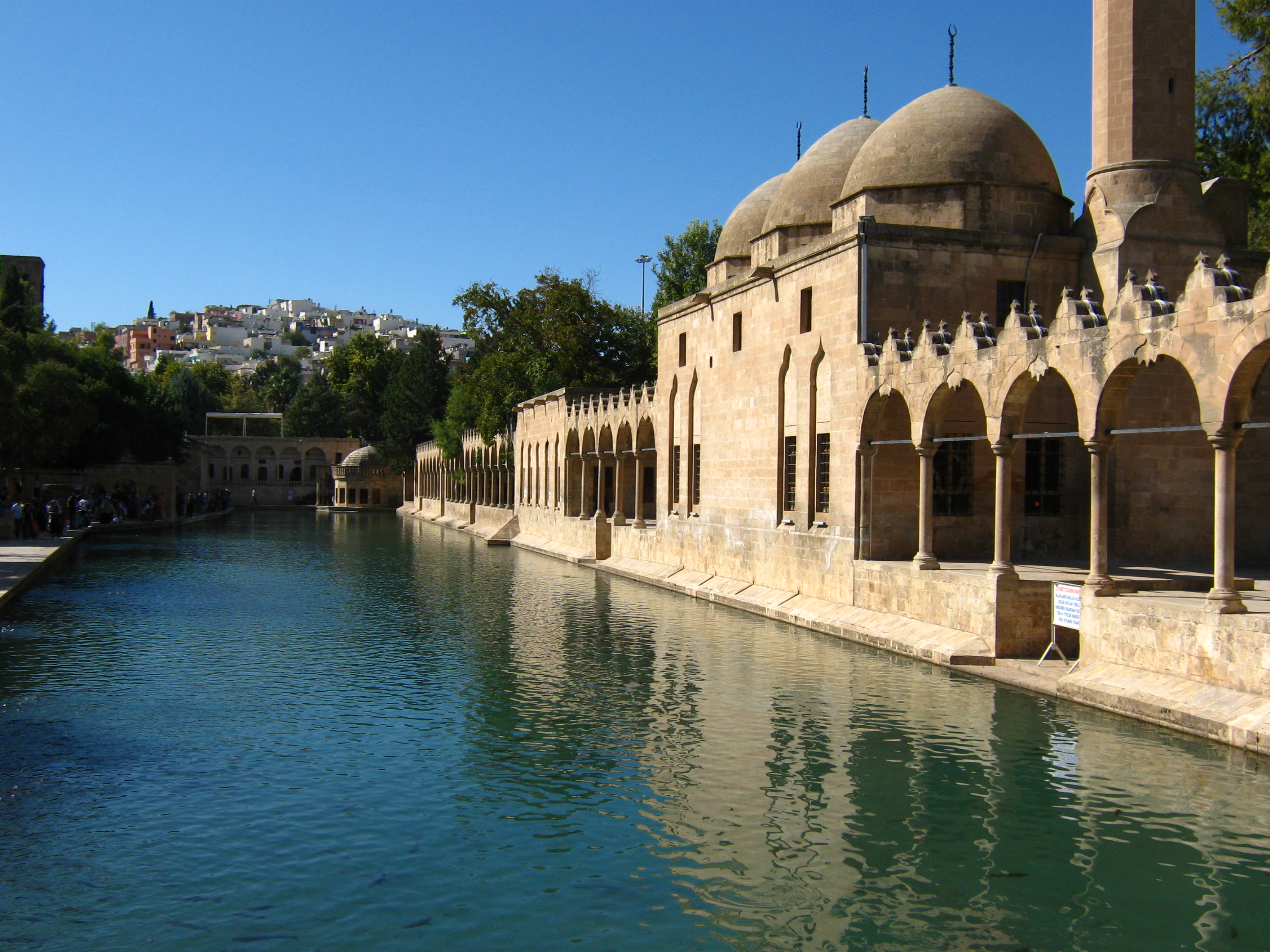
The fishpond of fish sacred to Atargatis survives at Şanlıurfa, the ancient Edessa, its mythology transferred to Ibrahim.

At her temples at Ashkelon, Hierapolis Bambyce, and Edessa, there were fish ponds containing fish only her priests might touch. Glueck noted in his 1937 paper that "to this day there is a sacred fish-pond swarming with untouchable fish at Qubbet el-Baeddwī, a dervish monastery three kilometres east of Tripolis, Lebanon."

The relief sculpture of the Syrian Goddess at Hierapolis was supported by a pair of tritonesses according to Lucian.

Cult sites in the Near East include Dura-Europos, Palmyra, Akko (Ptolemais), Carnaim (Note: 2 Macc. 12:26.) and Nabataea. Two well preserved temples in Niha, Lebanon are dedicated to her and to her consort Hadad.

From Syria, the worship of Atargatis and Hadad extended to Greece and to the furthest West into the Mediterranean. Lucian and Apuleius gave descriptions of the beggar-priests who went round the great cities with an image of the goddess on an ass and collected money. The wide extension of the cult is attributable largely to Syrian merchants; thus we find traces of it in the great seaport towns; at Delos especially numerous inscriptions have been found bearing witness to her importance. Again we find the cult in Sicily, introduced, no doubt, by slaves and mercenary troops, who carried it even to the farthest northern limits of the Roman Empire. The leader of the rebel slaves in the First Servile War, a Syrian named Eunus, claimed to receive visions of Atargatis, whom he identified with the Demeter of Enna.

=== Priesthood ===
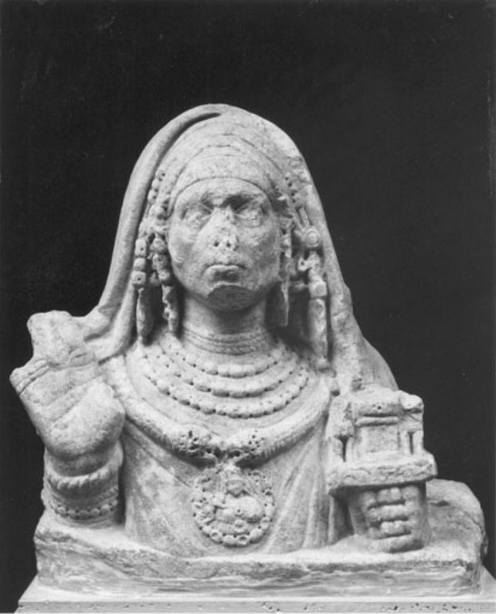
Bust of a priest of Atargatis, 3rd century AD, Capitoline Museums

During the Roman era, eunuch priests worshipped Atargatis, similar to the Galli priests of Cybele. At the shrine in Hieropolis founded by Semiramis, eunuch priests served the image of a fish-tailed woman. Rituals to the goddess were accompanied by flute playing and rattle shaking. In one rite, young males castrated themselves to become cross-dressing priests at the temple and thereafter performed tasks usually done by women. The obligatory lake or pond lay nearby, full of sacred fish which no one was allowed to eat; nor could anyone eat Atargatis's sacred doves. The priests were described by Apuleius as mendicants that traveled around with an image of the goddess dressed in a silken robe on the back of a donkey. When they arrived at village squares or a receptive estate they would perform an ecstatic rite, designed to attract a crowd and elicit their contributions. The priests were described as effeminate, wearing heavy makeup, turbans on their heads, and dressed in saffron colored robes of silk and linen; some in white tunics painted with purple stripes. They shouted and danced wildly to the music of flutes, whirling around with necks bent so that their long hair flew out; and in an ecstatic frenzy they would bite their own flesh and cut their arms with knives until they bled.

According to a story retold by Lucian, the Assyrian queen Stratonice saw in a vision that she must build a temple at Hieropolis to the goddess and so the king sent her there with a young man named Combabus to execute the task. Knowing the queen's reputation Combabus castrated himself and left his genitals, sealed in a box. When the queen fell in love with Combabus and tried to seduce him, he revealed his mutilation, but this didn't dissuade her from desiring his constant companionship. When Stratonice and Combabus returned home, she accused him of trying to seduce her, and Combabus was arrested, tried, and sentenced to death. Combabus called for the sealed box to prove his innocence, whereupon the king relented and rewarded Combabus for his loyalty. The temple was completed and a statue of Combabus was placed in it. This is said to be the origin of the practice of castration by the priests in the temple.

Another story ascribed to Combabus mentions that a certain foreign woman who had joined a sacred assembly, beholding a human form of extreme beauty and dressed in man's attire, became violently enamoured of him: after discovering that he was a eunuch, she committed suicide. Combabus accordingly in despair at his incapacity for love, donned woman's attire, so that no woman in future might be deceived in the same way.

== See also ==
- Astarte
- Inanna

== Sources ==
- Cowper, B. Harris (April 1865), "Directo, the Goddess of Ascalon", The Journal of Sacred Literature and Biblical Record, 7 (8): 1–20
- Downey, Susan B., ed. (1977), The Excavations at Dura-Europos: Final Report: The Stone and Plaster Sculpture, vol. III, Part 1, Fascicle 2, Los Angeles: Yale University Press
- Drijvers, H.J.W. (1999). "Atargatis". In van der Toorn, Karel; Becking, Bob; van der Horst, Pieter W. (eds.). Dictionary of Deities and Demons in the Bible. Boston, United States; Cambridge, United Kingdom; Grand Rapids, Michigan, United States; Köln, Germany; Leiden, Netherlands: Brill Publishers; William B. Eerdmans Publishing Company. pp. 114–116. ISBN 978-0-802-82491-2.
- Drijvers, H. J. W. (2015), "IV The Cult of Atargatis", Cults and Beliefs at Edessa, BRILL, pp. 76ff, ISBN 9789004295629
- Krebernik, Manfred [in German] (2012). Götter und Mythen des Alten Orients [Gods and Myths of the Ancient Orient]. Beck'sche Reihe (in German). Vol. 2708. Munich, Germany: C.H. Beck. ISBN 978-3-406-60522-2.
- Lucian of Samosata (2003). Lightfoot, J. L. (ed.). Lucian: On the Syrian Goddess. Oxford University Press. ISBN 9780199251384.
- Lipiński, Edward (2000). The Aramaeans: Their Ancient History, Culture, Religion. Orientalia Lovaniensia analecta. Vol. 100. Leuven, Belgium: Peeters Publishers. ISBN 978-9-042-90859-8.
- Maier, Walter A. III (2018). Ašerah: Extrabiblical Evidence. Harvard Semitic Monographs 37. BRILL. ISBN 9789004369436.
- Niehr, Herbert [in German] (2014). The Aramaeans in Ancient Syria. Handbook of Oriental Studies. Section 1 The Near and Middle East. Vol. 106. Leiden, Netherlands: Brill Publishers. ISBN 978-9-004-22943-3.
- Oden, R.A. (1977). Studies in Lucian's De Syria Dea. Harvard Semitic Monographs. Vol. 15. Missoula, United States: Scholars Press. ISBN 978-0-891-30123-3.
- Porten, Bezalel (1968). Archives from Elephantine: The Life of an Ancient Jewish Military Colony. Berkeley, United States: University of California Press. ISBN 978-0-520-01028-4.
- Rostovtzeff, M. I .; Bellinger, Alfred R. Bellinger, eds. (1929), The Excavations at Dura-Europos: Conducted by Yale University and the French Academy of Inscriptions and Letters; Preliminary Report of 1st- Season of Work, Yale University Press
- Smith, Mark S. (2014). "‛Athtart in Late Bronze Age Syrian Texts". In Sugimoto, David (ed.). Transformation of a Goddess: Ishtar - Astarte - Aphrodite. Fribourg, Switzerland; Göttingen, Germany: Academic Press Fribourg; Vandenhoeck & Ruprecht. pp. 33–85. ISBN 978-3-727-81748-9.
- Smith, W. Robertson (1887), "Notes and Documents: Ctesisas and the Semiramis Legend", The English Historical Review, 2: 303–317
- —— (2017) [1894], Religion of the Semites: The Fundamental Institutions (Repr. 2nd ed.), Routledge, pp. 303–317, ISBN 9781351493680
- Weinfeld, Moshe (1991). "Semiramis: her name and her origin." In: Mordechai Cogan; Israel Eph'al (ed.), Ah, Assyria...:Studies in Assyrian history and ancient Near Eastern historiography presented to Hayim Tadmor (series Scripta Hierosolymitana 33), Jerusalem: Magnes Press, Hebrew University, pp. 99–103.
