= Tessera (disambiguation) =

A tessera is an individual tile in a mosaic.

Tessera, plural tesserae, may also refer to:

- the number 4 in Greek (τέσσερα)
- dice used in ancient Rome
- the booklet of prayers of the Legion of Mary, a Catholic lay organization
- layers of calcification on sharks' otherwise cartilaginous jaws and backbones
- a frazione of the comune of Venice nearest to Mestre
- Venice-Tessera Airport
- Tessera (commerce), a token or tally in ancient and medieval times
- Tessera (Venusian geography), large regions of highly deformed terrain, possibly unique to Venus
- Tesserae (video game), a puzzle game for Macintosh computers
- Tessera, the codename for the original iMac G4
- Tessera Technologies, an international microelectronics company

== See also ==
- Tesseract
