= Austin Morris Harmon =

American classical philologist (1878–1950)

Austin Morris Harmon Ph.D., LL.D. (28 September 1878, Brockport, New York — 29 June 1950, Chebeague Island, Maine) was an American classical scholar. He published bilingual editions of Lucian's works in the Loeb Classical Library between 1913 and 1936 in a 5-volume series.

== Biography ==
His parents were George B. and Catharine Crowe Harmon. Harmon received his Bachelor of Arts degree from Williams College in 1903 and his Masters of Arts from Yale University in 1904. Additionally he studied in Göttingen in 1903-4. He received his PhD in 1908 and LL.D. in 1927.

He published two volumes of the Loeb Lucian while being a preceptor in Greek at Princeton University. He was soon recognized as a master translator and editor, and even Paul Shorey found little to criticize but much to praise. Harmon accepted Yale's offer of a professorship in Greek and occupied this post in 1916-23. He changed it for Hillhouse (1923–34) and then for Lampson (1934–45). Although editing and translating Lucian excluded him from most of other scholarly research, Harmon did not finish the task and prepared only 5 volumes of the intended 8 (the 6th was edited by K. Kilburn, the 7th and 8th by Matthew Donald Macleod). He retired in 1945 and died in 1950.

He edited vols. 1-5 of Yale Classical Studies (1928–35) & with others vols. 6-8 (1939–42). He was the president of CANE (1937–38) and of APA (1938–39).

== Personal life ==
He married Grace Newell on 19 December 1907.

== Publications ==
- The Clausula in Ammianus Marcellinus. Yale, 1908 (dissertation). Printed: Connecticut Academy of Arts and Sciences, Transactions 16 (1911), pp. 118–245
- Consucidus (Miles Gloriosus 787). Hermes 45 (1910), pp. 461–3
- Protesilaudamia Laevi. AJP 33 (1912), pp. 186–94
- Lucian with an English translation by A. M. Harmon. London & Cambridge, Massachusetts: William Heinemann Ltd & Harvard University Press. (LCL): vol. 1 (1913), vol. 2 (1915), vol. 3 (1921), vol. 4 (1925), vol. 5 (1936)
- The Poet κατ' ἐξοχήν. CP 18 (1923), pp. 35–47
- An Emendation in Lucian's Syrian Goddess. CP 19 (1924), pp. 72–74
- Greek Vases in the Museum of the American Academy in Rome. AAR, Memoirs 10 (1932), pp. 103–27
- The Scene of the Persians of Aeschylus. TAPA 63 (1932), pp. 7–19
- Egyptian Property Returns. YCS 4 (1934), pp. 135–230
