= De domo (disambiguation) =

In Polish tradition, de domo is an indicator of a woman's maiden name, similar to the French term née.

De domo may also refer to:

- De Domo, a treatise by Lucian of Samosata
- De domo sua, Cicero's Oratio De Domo Sua Ad Pontifices
