= Philagathos =

Philagathos may refer to:

- John Philagathos, Antipope John XVI (ca. 945 – ca. 1001), of Greco-Calabrian descent
- Philagathus of Cerami, (d. 1154 or later), monk and preacher, of Greco-Calabrian or Greco-Sicilian descent
