= Lover of Lies =

Work by Lucian

The Lover of Lies, also known as The Doubter or Philopseudes (Greek: Φιλοψευδὴς ἢ Ἀπιστῶν), is a frame story written by the Syrian satirist Lucian of Samosata (c. 125 – after 180). It is written in the Attic dialect of ancient Greek. It is primarily a work of satire making fun of people who believe in the supernatural. The book contains the earliest known version of the story of The Sorcerer's Apprentice.

== Summary ==
The dialogue begins with a young man named Tychiades asking his friend Philokles why most people are so fond of lies. After a brief discussion, Tychiades goes on to narrate an occasion when he went to visit an elderly friend named Eukrates hoping to meet his other friend Leontichos. At Eukrates's house, he encounters a large group of guests who have recently gathered together due to Eukrates suddenly falling ill. When Tychiades remarks that the folk remedies the other guests are suggesting to help Eukrates get better will not work, they all laugh at him. They then try to persuade him to believe in various superstitions by telling him stories, which grow increasingly ridiculous as the conversation goes on.

== See also ==
- A True Story
