= Oracular literature =

Genre of religiously inspired writing

Oracular literature, also called orphic or prophetic literature, positions the poet as a medium between humanity and another world, sometimes defined as supernatural or non-human.

== Concept ==
The idea is found in many ancient cultures. Among the Celts, for instance, the bard held the king accountable to his sacred vows (geasa) to land and people. In Greece, the oracles at Delphi and other sacred sites gave pronouncements in a highly stylized form of prophetic speech. Among indigenous North Americans, spiritual and/or political leaders like The Great Peacemaker used oracular rhetoric to artistic effect in delivering their messages.

== English-speaking cultures ==
Within the European and American literary traditions, oracular speech that links the individual creative artist with forces larger than the individual ego have been part of several movements. The Pre-Raphaelites objected to the humanism that was a feature of the Renaissance and sought for an earlier, presumably more holistic, art. The English Romantics found in nature a source of inspiration and a model for human societies. American Transcendentalists found inspiration in an oversoul, which Ralph Waldo Emerson also called an "oracular soul" in his 1841 essay "The Over-Soul". Surrealists sought to move past the logic of the waking mind and to draw from more universal material in the unconscious. Imagism based art on deep connection with an object outside the self, thus allowing some of its practitioners to develop an art with oracular content.

Important writers whose work has been defined as oracular include Arthur Rimbaud, Ralph Waldo Emerson, William Butler Yeats, T.S. Eliot, and H.D.

== Spanish theater ==
In the Spanish Golden Age theater play Life is a Dream by Calderon de la Barca, an oracle drives the plot. A prophecy reveals that king's infant son, Segismundo, will disgrace Poland and one day kill his father, but the king grants his son a chance to prove the oracle wrong.

== Modern usage ==
While modernism generally discouraged writers from employing an oracular voice to connect humanity with the more-than-human, some contemporary authors, especially those whose work reflects concern for the natural world and/or social justice, have embraced the role.

== See also ==
- Divination
- Prophecy
