= How to Write History =

2nd-century study by Lucian of Samosata

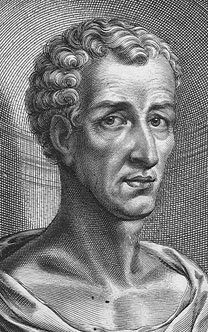
Fictional portrait of Lucian by William Fairthorne

How to Write History (Ancient Greek: Πῶς δεῖ ἱστορίαν συγγράφειν) is the title of a study by the classical Syrian writer Lucian, which may be considered the only work on the theory of history-writing to survive from antiquity.

== Themes ==
The first part of Lucian’s essay involved a critical attack on contemporary historians. Lucian maintained that they confused history with panegyric, overloaded it with irrelevant details, and weighed it down with overblown rhetoric.

Lucian recommended instead the virtues of clear narration, and the valorisation of truth. He argued that the historian should write for all times, as “a free man, fearless, incorruptible, the friend of truth”; and held up the work of Thucydides as the legislative template for all subsequent historians. He argued that the "historian's sole task is to tell the tale as it happened" which is later reflected in works of von Ranke among others.

== Later influence ==
- The early Renaissance saw the essay taken up by figures like Guarino da Verona and Giovanni Pontano.
- Edward Gibbon, who wrote of “the inimitable Lucian”, owned the 1776 edition of Quomodo Historia Conscribenda Sit (Oxford)

== See also ==
- Anneus Florus
- A True History
- Polybius
