= Jane Lightfoot =

British academic (born 1969)

Jane Lightfoot FBA
- Born: October 25, 1969 (age 56); Liverpool, England

Academic background
- Education: The Belvedere School
- Alma mater: St John's College, Oxford; St Hugh's College, Oxford

Academic work
- Discipline: Classical scholar
- Sub-discipline: Ancient Greek literature; Hellenistic period; Greece in the Roman era; mythography; oracular literature
- Institutions: All Souls College, Oxford; New College, Oxford; Faculty of Classics, University of Oxford

Jane Lucy Lightfoot FBA (born 1969) is a British classical scholar. She is Professor of Greek Literature at the University of Oxford and a fellow of New College, Oxford.

== Early life and education ==
Lightfoot was born on 25 October 1969 in Liverpool, England. She was educated at The Belvedere School, an all-girls private school. She then studied Classics at St John's College, Oxford, graduating with a first class Bachelor of Arts (BA) degree in 1992: as per tradition, her BA was promoted to a Master of Arts (MA Oxon) degree in 1994. She stayed at Oxford to study for a Doctor of Philosophy (DPhil) degree, and was a Jubilee Scholar at St Hugh's College, Oxford, for the 1993/94 academic year and a Prize Fellow at All Souls College, Oxford, from 1994. She completed her doctorate in 1995 with a thesis titled "Parthenius" (concerning the ancient Greek poet, Parthenius of Nicaea), for which she won the Conington Prize.

== Academic career ==
Lightfoot was awarded a Prize Fellowship at All Souls College, Oxford, in 1994, while she was a doctoral student at the University of Oxford, which she held until 2000. Then, from 2000 to 2003, she was a post-doctoral fellow at All Souls. She has been a fellow and tutor in classics at New College, Oxford, since 2003. In 2014, she was awarded a Title of Distinction by the University of Oxford as "Professor of Greek Literature".

Her research interests include most aspects of Greek literature, with her publications focusing primarily on Hellenistic and imperial literature. Her specialism is in the exploration of underrepresented classical texts, including mythography, ethnography, oracular literature, poetry and prose, and late antique astrological poetry. Her current project is an edition of the medical author Aretaeus of Cappadocia.

== Honours ==
Lightfoot was elected a Fellow of the British Academy (FBA) in 2018, the United Kingdom's national academy for the humanities and social sciences. She is an Honorary Fellow of St John's College, Oxford.

== Selected publications ==
- Parthenius of Nicaea (Oxford, 1999)
- Lucian, On the Syrian Goddess (Oxford, 2003)
- The Sibylline Oracles (Oxford, 2007)
- A Hellenistic Collection (Cambridge, MA, 2009)
- Dionysius Periegetes, Description of the Known World: With Introduction, Translation, and Commentary (Oxford, 2014)
- Pseudo-Manetho, Apotelesmatica, Books Two, Three, and Six: Edited with Introduction, Translation, and Commentary (Oxford, 2020)
- Pseudo-Manetho, Apotelesmatica, Books Four, One, and Five: Edited with Introduction, Translation, and Commentary (Oxford, 2023)
