= On the Syrian Goddess =

Greek treatise by Lucian of Samosata

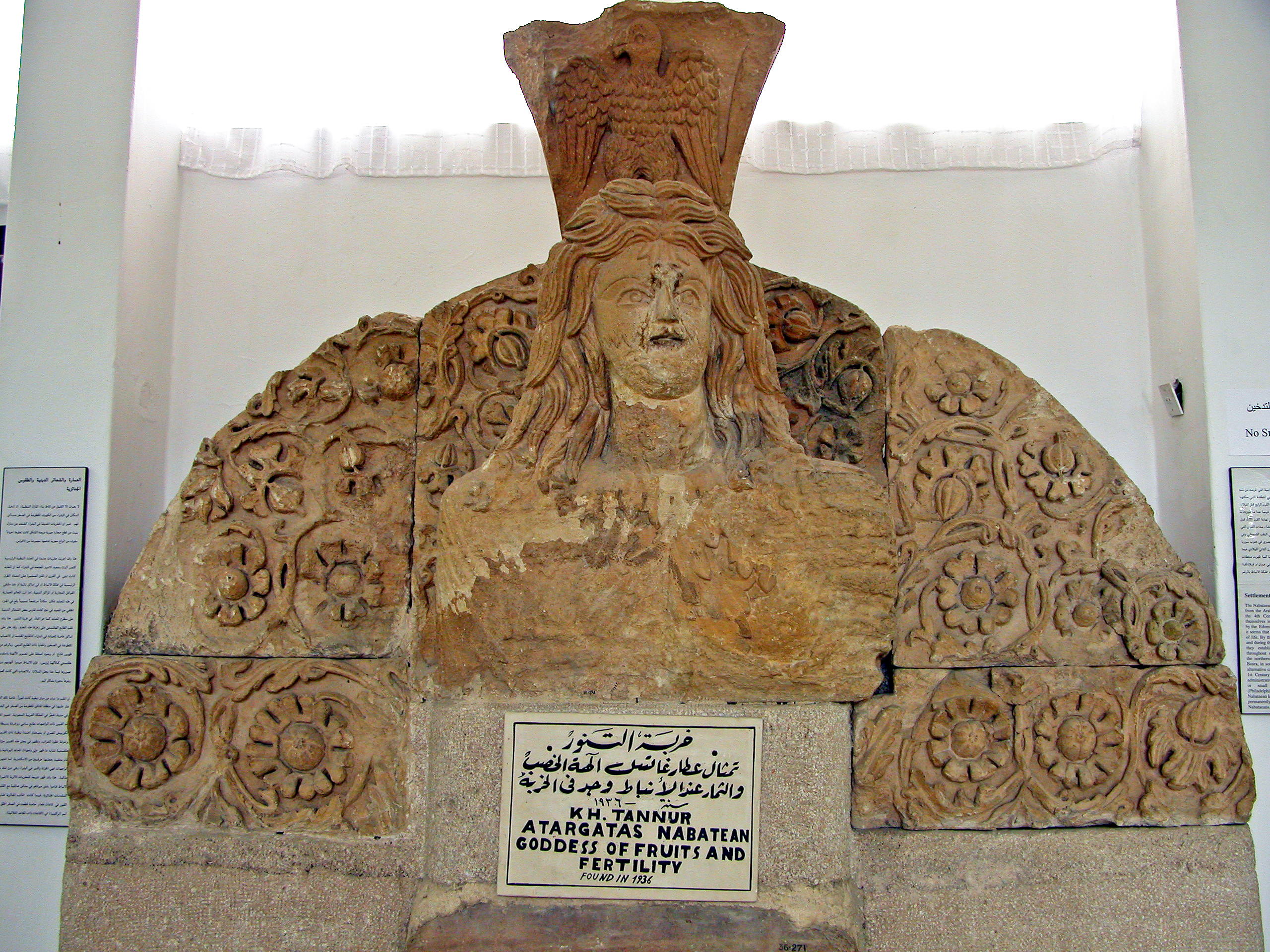
A Nabataean depiction of the goddess Atargatis dating from sometime around 100 A.D., roughly seventy years before Lucian (or possibly Pseudo-Lucian) wrote The Syrian Goddess; currently housed in the Jordan Archaeological Museum

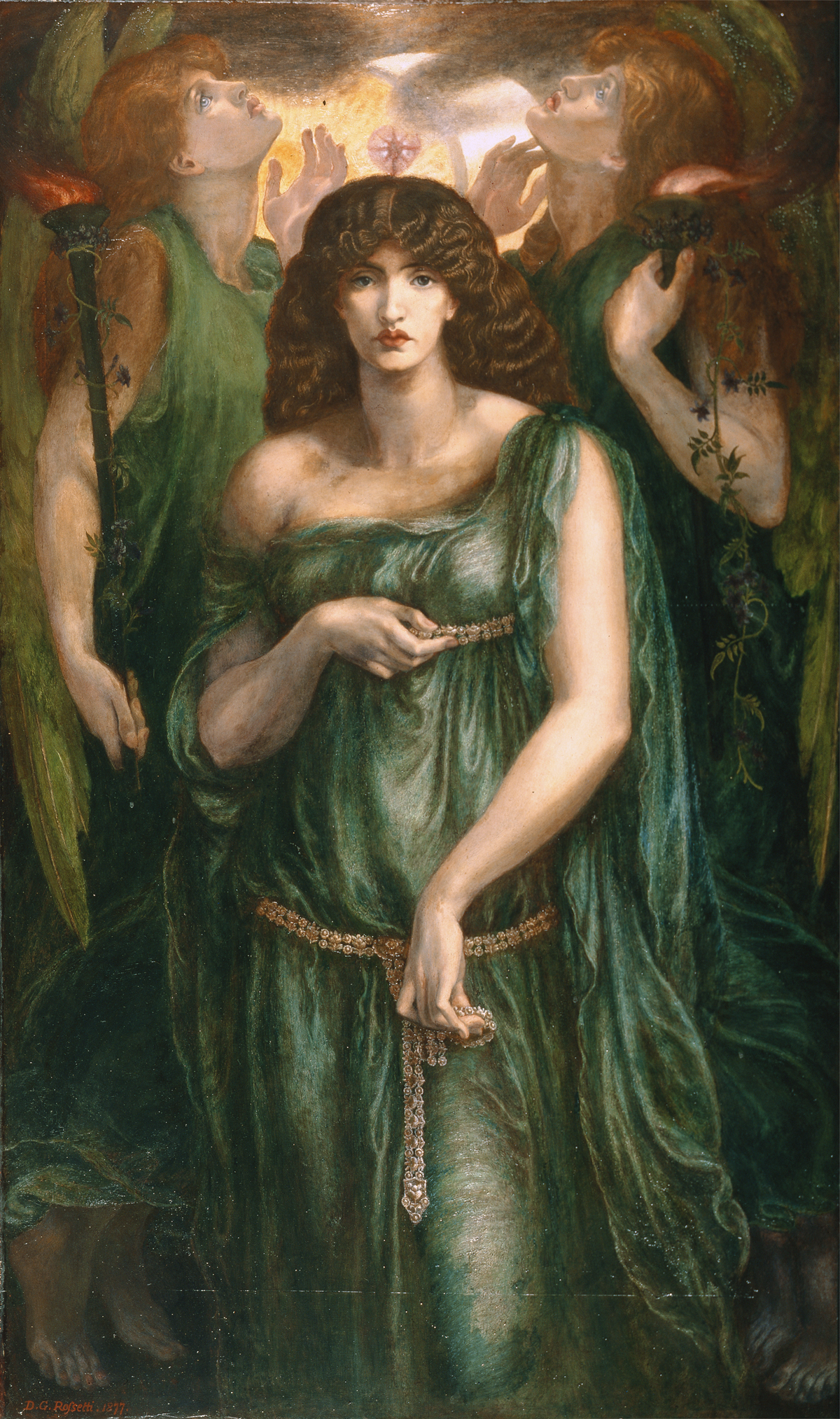
A painting by Dante Gabriel Rossetti completed in 1877 depicting Atargatis, the goddess described in On the Syrian Goddess

On the Syrian Goddess (Ancient Greek: Περὶ τῆς Συρίης Θεοῦ; Latin: De Dea Syria) is a Greek treatise of the second century AD which describes religious cults practiced at the temple of Hierapolis Bambyce, now Manbij, in Syria. The work is written in a Herodotean style of Ionic Greek, and has been traditionally ascribed to the Syrian essayist Lucian of Samosata.

== Authorship ==
Lucian has the reputation of being a witty scoffer, thanks to his many genuine essays and dialogues, and thus the reliability of De Dea Syria as an authentic picture of religious life in Syria in the second century has been brought into question, but given the possibility that Lucian is not in fact the author, the treatise may in fact be more accurate than was previously supposed. A more recent analysis concludes that Lucian is in fact the author but that this does not preclude historical accuracy.

== Summary ==
De Dea Syria describes the worship as being of a phallic character, with votaries offering little male figures of wood and bronze. There were also huge phalluses set up like obelisks before the temple, which were ceremoniously climbed once a year and decorated. The treatise begins with a retelling of the Atra-Hasis flood myth, where floodwaters are drained through a small cleft in the rock under the temple.

Castration and ritual sex went on in the temple precinct, and there was an elaborate ritual on entering the city and first visiting the shrine under the conduct of local guides. A mode of divination by movements of a xoanon of Apollo was also practiced.

The treatise also provides a physical description of the temple. It was of Ionic character, with gold-plated doors and roof, and much gilt decoration. Inside was a holy chamber into which only priests were allowed to enter. Here were statues of a goddess and a god in gold, the goddess statue more richly decorated with gems and other ornaments. Between them stood a gilt xoanon, which seems to have been carried outside in sacred processions. Other rich furniture is described. A great bronze altar stood in front, set about with statues, and in the forecourt lived numerous sacred animals and birds (but not swine) used for sacrifice. The temple also had a tank of sacred fish, of which Aelian also relates marvels.

Some three hundred priests served the shrine and there were numerous minor ministrants. The lake was the centre of sacred festivities and it was customary for votaries to swim out and decorate an altar standing in the middle of the water.

== Bibliography ==
- The Syrian Goddess translated by Herbert A. Strong, John Garstang (1913) at Internet Archive,
- J.L. Lightfoot (2003), Lucian On the Syrian Goddess: Edited with Introduction, Translation and Commentary. Oxford: Oxford University Press.
