= Tessera (commerce) =

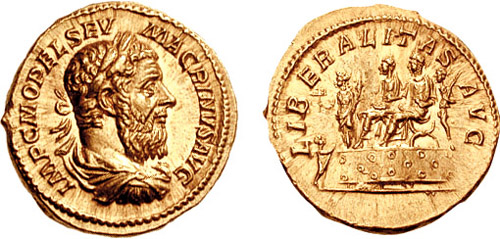
Aureus by Roman Emperor Macrinus - The Emperor gives Tesserae to the people

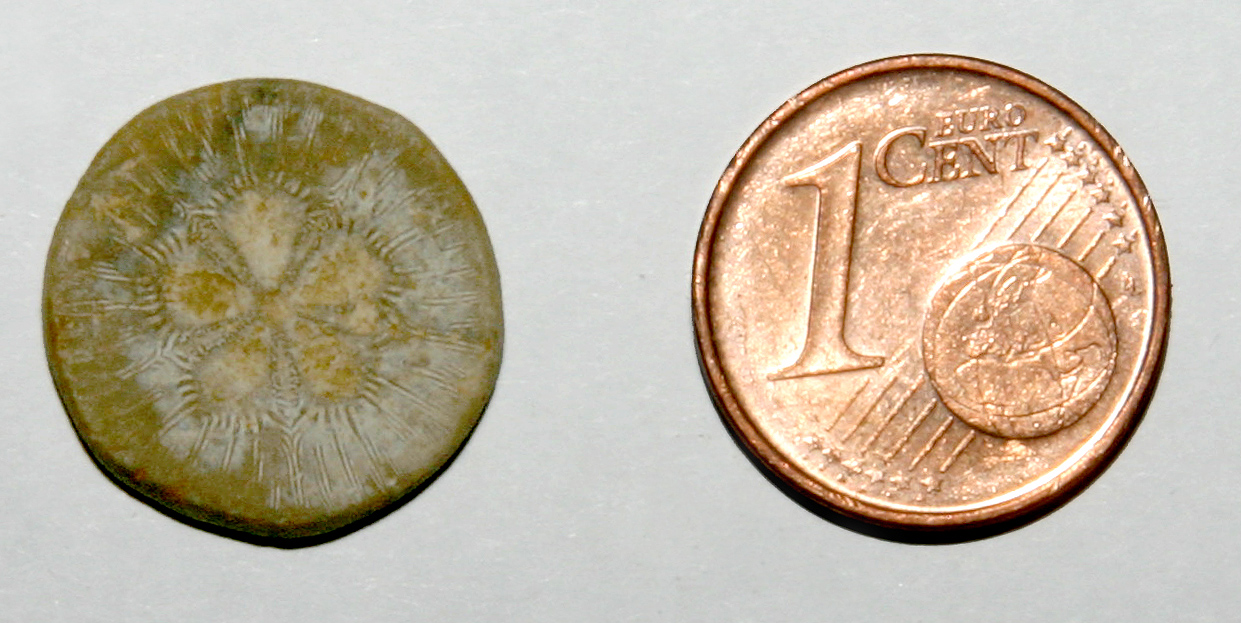
Roman Tessera

A tessera was the ancient Roman equivalent of a theater ticket. Stamped into a clay shard was an entrance aisle and row number for spectators attending an event at an amphitheater or arena. Above the doors of the Colosseum in Rome are numbers corresponding to those stamped into a spectator's tessera. Tesserae frumentariae and nummariae were tokens given at certain times by the Roman magistrates to citizens, in exchange for which they received a fixed amount of wheat or money.
