= Philagathus of Cerami =

Philagathus (Greek: Φιλάγαθος ὁ Κεραμεύς or Κεραμίτης; Italian: Filagato di Cerami; d. 1154 or later), later known erroneously as Theophanes Cerameus, was a Greek monk and preacher from Sicily or Calabria. His surname (Kerameus) may indicate that he was born in Cerami. He was a monk at Rossano. Around ninety of his sermons in Greek survive.
