= List of Cynic philosophers =

This is a list of Cynic philosophers, ordered (roughly) by date. The criteria for inclusion in this list is fairly mild. See also Category:Cynic philosophers.

Name	Period	Notes
4th Century BC
Antisthenes	c. 445 – 365 BC	Pupil of Socrates. Laid down the principles of Cynic philosophy.
Diogenes of Sinope	c. 412 – 323 BC	Cynic philosopher. Became the archetypal Cynic.
Onesicritus	c. 360 – c. 290 BC	Pupil of Diogenes. Travelled with Alexander the Great.
Philiscus of Aegina	fl. 325 BC	Son of Onesicritus, pupil of Diogenes.
Hegesias of Sinope	fl. 325 BC	Pupil of Diogenes.
Monimus of Syracuse	fl. 325 BC	Pupil of Diogenes.
Crates of Thebes	c. 365 – c. 285 BC	Cynic philosopher. Teacher of Zeno of Citium.
Hipparchia of Maroneia	fl. 325 BC	Wife of Crates of Thebes.
Metrocles of Maroneia	fl. 325 BC	Brother of Hipparchia, pupil of Crates of Thebes.
Theombrotus	fl. 300 BC	Follower of Crates of Thebes.
Cleomenes	fl. 300 BC	Cynic philosopher and follower of Crates.
3rd Century BC
Bion of Borysthenes	c. 325 – c. 250 BC	Cynic philosopher and Sophist.
Sotades of Maroneia	fl. 275 BC	Poet who wrote on Cynic themes.
Menippus of Gadara	fl. 275 BC	Cynic philosopher and moral satirist.
Menedemus	fl. 250 BC	Cynic philosopher
Cercidas of Megalopolis	c. 290 – c. 220 BC	Cynic philosopher-poet.
Teles of Megara	fl. 235 BC	Cynic teacher and writer of discourses.
1st Century BC
Meleager of Gadara	fl. 90 BC	Cynic poet-philosopher.
1st Century AD
Demetrius of Corinth	c. 1 – c. 75 AD	Cynic teacher, friend of Thrasea Paetus and Seneca.
2nd Century AD
Agathobulus	fl. 125 AD	Cynic philosopher. Teacher of Demonax and Peregrinus.
Secundus the Silent	fl. 130 AD	Cynic philosopher who met Emperor Hadrian.
Demonax of Cyprus	fl. 150 AD	Cynic philosopher who taught Lucian.
Peregrinus Proteus	100–165 AD	Cynic philosopher who killed himself at the Olympic Games.
Theagenes of Patras	fl. 150 AD	Pupil of Peregrinus who praised his master's suicide.
Oenomaus of Gadara	fl. c. 150 AD	Cynic critic of religious belief.
Pancrates of Athens	fl. 150 AD	Cynic philosopher.
Crescens	fl. 160 AD	Cynic philosopher and critic of Justin Martyr.
4th Century AD
Heraclius	fl. 360 AD	Cynic philosopher criticised by the emperor Julian in an oration.
Asclepiades	fl. 360 AD	Cynic philosopher who visited the emperor Julian in Antioch.
Horus	fl. 375 AD	Olympic boxer who became a Cynic.
5th Century AD
Sallustius of Emesa	fl. c. 450 AD	Neoplatonist who became a Cynic.

== See also ==
- List of ancient Greek philosophers
- List of ancient Platonists
- List of Epicurean philosophers
- List of Stoic philosophers
