= Simmias =

Simmias (Greek: Σιμμίας) may refer to:

- Simmias of Thebes, follower of Socrates
- Simmias of Macedon, general of Alexander the Great
- Simmias of Rhodes, poet and grammarian (late 4th century BC)
- Simmias of Syracuse, student of philosophy
- Simmias (explorer), Ptolemaic explorer of Red Sea. (3rd century BC)
