= Xeniades =

Ancient Greek philosopher

- Born: c. 450 BC; Corinth
- Died: c. 345 BC

Philosophical work
- Region: Western philosophy
- School: Ionian; Skepticism

Xeniades (Greek: Ξενιάδης) was a skeptical philosopher from Corinth, probably a follower of the pre-Socratic Xenophanes. There may have been two such persons, as he is referenced by Democritus c. 400 BC, though was also supposedly the purchaser of Diogenes the Cynic c. 350 BC, when he was captured by pirates and sold as a slave. Xeniades was supposed to have been the man who persuaded Monimus to become a follower of Diogenes, and was the source of his skeptical doctrines.

== Skepticism ==
The little that is known of him is derived from Sextus Empiricus, who represents him as holding the most ultrasceptical opinions, and maintaining that all notions are false, and that there is absolutely nothing true in the universe. He more than once couples him with Xenophanes.

== Purchaser of Diogenes ==
Two separate fictionalised accounts are used by Diogenes Laërtius in his account of Diogenes being sold into slavery, one by Menippus, and one by an otherwise unknown Eubulus, both of whom wrote in the 3rd century BCE. It is told that Diogenes said to Xeniades, "You must obey me, although I am a slave, for a physician or a steersman would find men to obey them even though they might be slaves." Eubulus recounts that Diogenes educated Xeniades's sons, eventually growing old in Xeniades' house. Xeniades is supposed to have remarked "A good spirit has entered my house." It is impossible to say whether any of this is accurate or even whether Xeniades actually existed, but another Cynic, Cleomenes, also made use of the theme of Diogenes being sold into slavery, and Xeniades was supposed to have been the man who persuaded Monimus to become a follower of Diogenes.
