= Diatribe =

Literary genre

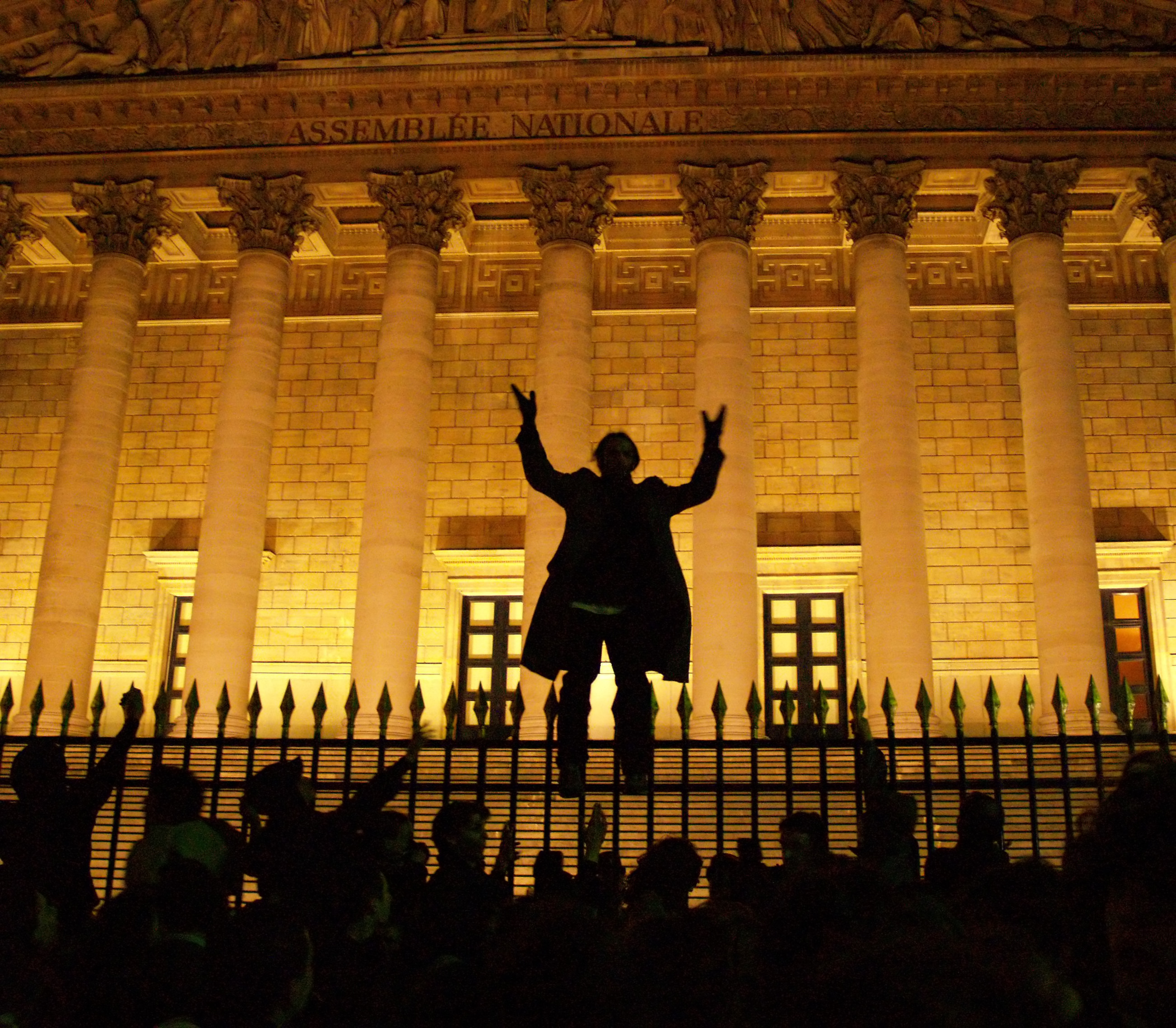
A street protester delivers a harangue in front of the National Assembly in Paris, France, in 2006.

A diatribe (from the Greek διατριβή), also known less formally as rant, is a lengthy oration, though often reduced to writing, made in criticism of someone or something, often employing humor, sarcasm, and appeals to emotion.

== Historical meaning ==
The terms diatribe and rant (and, to a lesser extent, tirade and harangue) have at times been subtly distinguished, but in modern discourse are often used interchangeably. A diatribe or rant is not a formal classification of argument, and religious author Alistair Stewart-Sykes notes that "[t]he form of the diatribe is difficult precisely to ascertain". It has been proposed that the terms diatribe, tirade, harangue, and rant "are similar, but offer different shades of meaning":

Tirade is the most general of these, describing any long, critical speech; a harangue is particularly bombastic, usually inflaming the passions of listeners, and is the primary tool of the demagogue; a rant is primarily an instrument of catharsis, allowing the speaker to blow off steam, but not necessarily persuade or do harm; a diatribe is more tiresome—while a harangue can arouse passion, and a rant can be entertaining to watch, a diatribe is neither inspiring, informative, nor entertaining.

It has been suggested that a rant is merely one kind of diatribe, with one explanation stating that "[a] rant can be defined loosely as an emotionally charged narrative or diatribe often expressing a strong distaste or anger on the one hand, or a declamatory, often pompous, assertion on the other". A number of notable works have been described as diatribes, such as the Diatribes of Greek philosopher Bion of Borysthenes, in which he satirized the foolishness of people; the Diatribes of Teles of Megara written circa 235 BC, which present the basis of the philosophy of Cynicism; and the Diatribes, or Discourses, of Epictetus, circulated by Arrian circa 108 AD, introducing aspects of Stoicism. An examination of the use of diatribe by the 4th century BC Greek philosopher Euripides states:

The peculiarity of the diatribe as distinct from other forms of popular moralizing lies in the assumed presence of an opponent. He is not permitted to reply, but his position is indicated by statements or rhetorical questions put into his mouth by the speaker, and thus the introduction of an objection in the form of a question becomes one of the characteristic features of the diatribe. It is evidently a development of the dialogue form, and is usually traced to the Platonic dialogues.

The opponent assumed to be argued against in a diatribe is "a fictitious individual introduced by the speaker merely as a part of the rhetorical machinery of his discourse", who states the position of the opponent before providing "indication of the untenability of that position by means of illustration, rhetorical question, proverb, argumentum e contrario, etc., and in conclusion a statement of the speaker's own view". Although a diatribe or rant is not inherently humorous, rants have become a staple of modern comedy, performed as "over-the-top ramblings with a single point of view on a wide variety of subjects".

== Diatribes in religious speech ==
Stewart-Sykes proposes that there is a difference between "pagan" diatribes, which he suggests are directed against a present individual, and Christian diatribes, which he suggests are directed against a hypothetical other person, but more fully intended to persuade the reader or listener. A noted historical example of a religious diatribe can be found in Paul's Epistle to the Romans. With respect to that usage, a diatribe is described as an oration in which the speaker seeks to persuade an audience by debating an imaginary opponent, "typically using second person singular". The speaker "raises hypothetical questions and responds to them or states false conclusions and goes on to refute them".

The literary historian and theorist Mikhail Bakhtin notes that it was "the diatribe, not classical rhetoric, that exercised a defining influence on the generic characteristics of the ancient Christian sermon."

== Sources ==
- Combe, Kirk (2026). "Satiric Emotions: Diatribe/Tirade/Rant". In Wendt, Daniel; Flucher, Elisabeth; Pieper, Vincenz (eds.). Handbuch Satire. Berlin: Springer. doi:10.1007/978-3-662-67938-8_43-1.
