= Hipparchia =

Hipparchia may refer to:

- Hipparchia of Maroneia, an ancient Greek philosopher c. 325 BC
- Hipparchia (butterfly), a butterfly genus
