= Bion of Borysthenes =

Ancient Greek philosopher

Bion of Borysthenes (Greek: Βίων Βορυσθενίτης; c. 325 – c. 250 BC) was a Greek philosopher. After being sold into slavery, and then released, he moved to Athens, where he studied in almost every school of philosophy. It is, however, for his Cynic-style diatribes that he is chiefly remembered. He satirized the foolishness of people, attacked religion, and eulogized philosophy.

== Life ==
Bion was from the town of Olbia on the north coast of the Black Sea by the mouth of the river Borysthenes (modern-day Dnieper). He lived between around 325 and 250 BC, but the exact dates of his birth and death are uncertain. Strabo mentions him as a contemporary of Eratosthenes, who was born 275 BC. Diogenes Laërtius has preserved an account in which Bion describes his parentage to Antigonus II Gonatas, King of Macedonia. His father was a freedman and a dealer in salt fish, with which he combined the occupation of smuggling. His mother, Olympia, was a Lacedaemonian prostitute. The whole family were sold as slaves, on account of some offence committed by the father. In consequence of this, Bion fell into the hands of a rhetorician, who made him his heir. Having burnt his patron's library, he went to Athens, and applied himself to philosophy, in the course of which study he embraced the tenets of almost every sect in succession. First, he was an Academic under Xenocrates and Crates of Athens, then he became a Cynic, (perhaps under Crates of Thebes), afterwards he attached to Theodorus, the Cyrenaic philosopher whose alleged atheism is supposed to have influenced Bion, and finally he became a pupil of Theophrastus the Peripatetic. After the manner of the sophists of the period, Bion travelled through Greece and Macedonia, and was in contact with Antigonus II Gonatas. Some modern research literature claims that Antigonus invited him to his court at Pella, but this assumption is not based on ancient sources and pure speculation. Bion taught philosophy at Rhodes, and died at Chalcis in Euboea.

== Philosophy ==
Because of his early association with the Academy, Diogenes Laërtius placed Bion among the Academics, but there is nothing in his life or thought suggesting an affinity with Platonism and modern scholars regard him as a Cynic, albeit an atypical one with strong Hedonistic or Cyrenaic leanings. Much of what Laërtius has to say about Bion seems to have been drawn from hostile sources so care has to be taken in using his account to reconstruct Bion's life and thought. Laërtius reveals to us a man of considerable intellectual acuteness, but quite ready to attack everyone and everything. He was essentially a popular writer, and in his Diatribes he satirized the foolishness of people. While eulogizing poverty and philosophy, he attacked the gods, musicians, geometricians, astrologers, and the wealthy, and denied the efficacy of prayer. Laërtius claims Bion was an atheist (which he allegedly renounced at the time of his death) but the surviving fragments reveal only a religious skepticism concerning mystery religions, oracles, etc. The quotations of Bion recorded by Teles, and preserved by Stobaeus reveal a man who "treats of ordinary human problems in a common-sense spirit, though for emphasis employing all the devices of contemporary prose style. ... The situations dealt with are those that may confront any person, from the universalia of old age, poverty, exile, slavery, the fear of death, down to the more particular case of a nagging wife."

His influence is distinctly traceable in succeeding writers, e.g. in the satires of Menippus. Horace alludes to his satires and caustic wit. Examples of this wit are his sayings:

"The miser did not possess wealth, but was possessed by it."
"Impiety was the companion of credulity, [and] avarice the metropolis of vice."
"Good slaves are really free, and bad freemen really slaves."

One saying is preserved by Cicero:

"It is useless to tear our hair when we are in grief, since sorrow is not cured by baldness."

Another is cited by Plutarch:

"Though boys throw stones at frogs in sport, the frogs do not die in sport but in earnest."

== Works ==
1. On Anger, mentioned by Philodemus
