= Meleager of Gadara =

1st-century BC Greek poet

- Μελέαγρος
- Born: Gadara, Hasmonean Judea
- Died: Kos, Roman Empire
- Occupations: Poet, anthologist
- Writing career
- Language: Ancient Greek
- Years active: 1st century BC
- Period: Hellenistic period
- Genres: Epigram, poetry, satirical prose
- Subjects: Love, sensuality, satire
- Notable work: The Garland
- Literary movement: Cynic philosophy

Meleager of Gadara (Ancient Greek: Μελέαγρος Meleagros; fl. 1st century BC) was a poet and collector of epigrams. He wrote some satirical prose, now lost, and some sensual poetry, of which 134 epigrams survive.

== Life ==
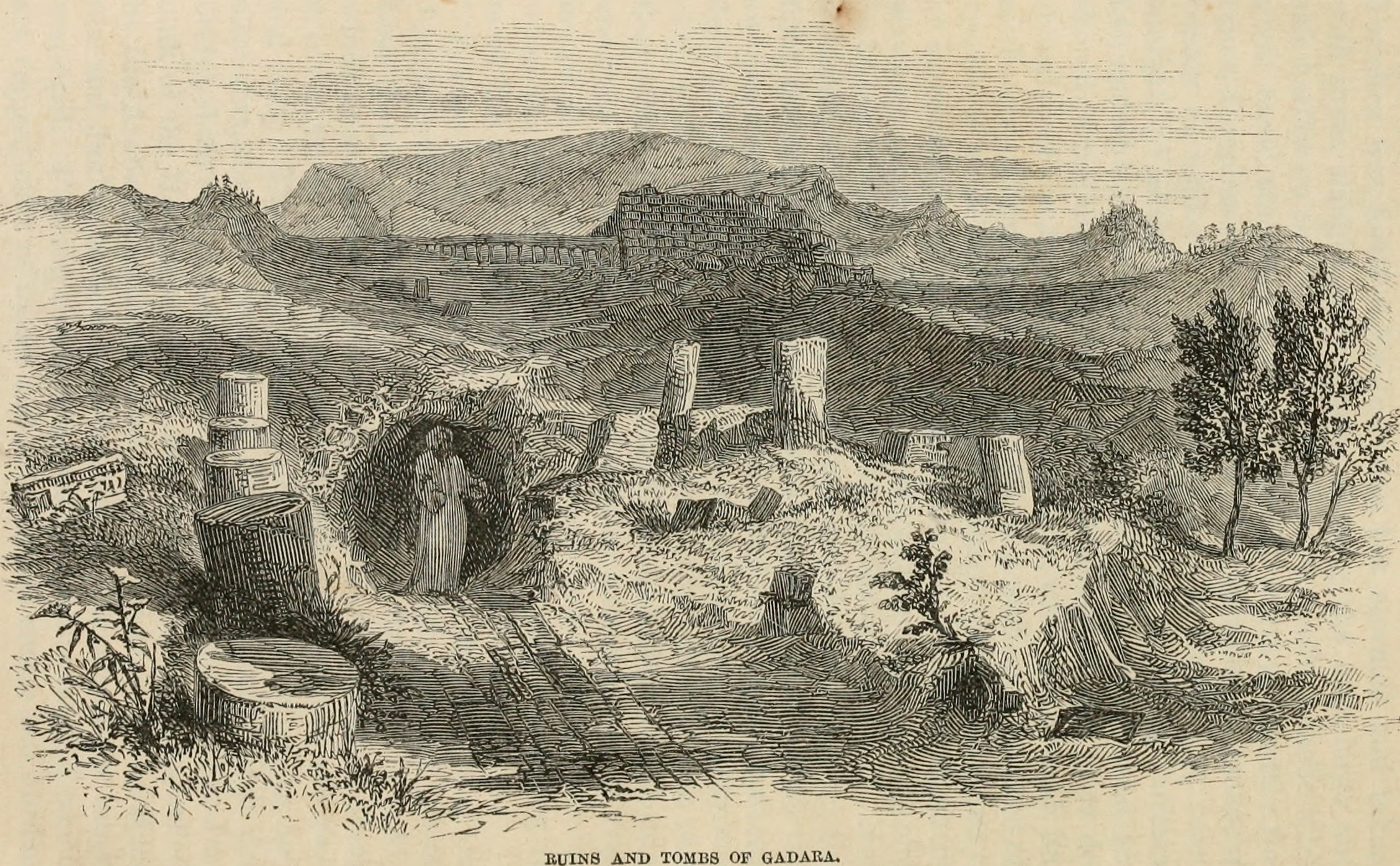
View of the ruins and tombs of Gadara (1864)

Meleager was the son of Eucrates, born in the city of Gadara, now Umm Qais in Jordan, then part of the Hasmonean Kingdom, which was then a partially Hellenized community noted for its "remarkable contribution to Greek culture". He was educated in Tyre and spent his later life in Cos where he died at an advanced age, perhaps at 70. According to short autobiographical poems he wrote, Meleager was proud of his hometown and identified himself as cosmopolitan, being both "Attic" (i.e. Hellenistic) and Syrian, and also praised Tyre for having "made [him] a man" and Cos for taking "care of [him] in [his] old age".

The scholiast to the Palatine manuscript of the Greek Anthology says he flourished in the reign of Seleucus VI Epiphanes (95 – 93 BC). The uppermost date of his compilation of the Anthology is 60 BC, as it did not include Philodemus of Gadara, though later editors added thirty-four epigrams.

Some writers classed him among the Cynics, and according to historian Benjamin Isaac Meleager's belief that "all men are equal and compatriots" strengthens this view, as some Cynics already held such a world view possibly as early as the 5th century BC. Like his compatriot Menippus, Meleager wrote what were known as spoudogeloia (Greek singular: σπουδογέλοιος), satirical prose essays putting philosophy in popular form with humorous illustrations. These are completely lost. Meleager's fame is securely founded on the one hundred and thirty-four epigrams of his own which he included in his Anthology. The manuscripts of the Greek Anthology are the sole source of these epigrams.

== The Garland of Meleager ==
Meleager is famous for his anthology of poetry entitled The Garland (Greek: Στέφανος). Polemon of Ilium and others had created collections of monumental inscriptions, or of poems on particular subjects earlier, but Meleager first did so comprehensively. He collected epigrams by 46 Greek poets, from every lyric period up to his own. His title referred to the commonplace comparison of small beautiful poems to flowers, and in the introduction to his work, he attached the names of various flowers, shrubs, and herbs—as emblems—to the names of the several poets. The Garland itself has survived only as one of the original constituent roots to the Greek Anthology.

Cities where Meleager lived

== Poetry ==
Meleager's poetry is concerned with personal experience and emotions, frequently with love and its discontents. He typically describes himself not as an active and engaged lover, but as one struck by the beauty of a woman or boy. The following is an example:

The wine-cup is glad: dear Zenophilè’s lip
It boasts to have touched, when she stooped down to sip.
Happy wine-cup! I wish that, with lips joined to mine,
All my soul at a draught she would drink up like wine.

Next, he expresses his love for a young man named Charidemus, but fears competing with Zeus:

I wish not Charidemus to be mine; for the fair boy looks to Zeus, as if already serving the god with nectar. I wish it not. What profits it me to have the king of heaven as a competitor for victory in love? I am content if only the boy, as he mounts to Olympus, take from earth my tears to wash his feet in memory of my love; and could he but give me one sweet, melting glance and let our lips just meet as I snatch one kiss! Let Zeus have all the rest, as is right; but yet, if he were willing, perchance I, too, should taste ambrosia.

=== Mention of the Sabbath ===
Meleager was among the earliest non-Jewish authors to mention the Jewish day of rest, the Sabbath. In one of his poems, he writes:

White-cheeked Demo, some one hath thee named next him and is taking his delight, but my own heart groans within me. If thy lover is some Sabbath-keeper no great wonder! Love burns hot even on Cold Sabbaths.

The Jewish prohibition against kindling fire on the Sabbath, and, by extension, against cooking, appears to have given rise to the notion of "cold Sabbaths." This motif later reappeared in the works of other ancient authors, such as Rutilius Claudius Namatianus.

== Bibliography ==
=== Texts and translations ===
- The Greek Anthology I (Loeb Classical Library) W. R. Paton (1916) Cambridge MA: Harvard University Press; London: Heinemann) [Original Greek with facing page English translations]
- Select Epigrams from the Greek Anthology. J. W. Mackail (1890) Longmans, Green & Co. [English translations]
- The Greek Anthology. Charles Neaves (1874) New York: John B. Alden [English translations and commentary]

=== Secondary sources ===
- Isaac, Benjamin (2017). Empire and Ideology in the Graeco-Roman World. Cambridge: Cambridge University Press. ISBN 978-1-107-13589-5.
- Smith, Philip (1867) "Meleager"; "Planudes". In William Smith (ed.) Dictionary of Greek and Roman Biography and Mythology. 3. Boston: Little, Brown & Co.
