= Pasicles of Thebes =

Pasicles of Thebes (Greek: Πασικλῆς ὁ Θηβαῖος; 4th century BC) was a Greek philosopher and brother of the Cynic philosopher Crates of Thebes. He attended the lectures of his brother Crates, but he is otherwise connected with the Megarian school of philosophy, because Diogenes Laërtius calls him a pupil of Euclid of Megara, and the Suda calls him a pupil of an unknown "Dioclides the Megarian." Pasicles is said to have been the teacher of Stilpo, who became leader of the Megarian school. Thus we have the implausible (although not impossible) situation of Pasicles teaching Stilpo, Stilpo teaching Crates, and Crates teaching Pasicles. Crates named his son Pasicles.
