= Hegesias =

Hegesias may refer to:

- Hegesias of Sinope, Cynic philosopher, c. 325 BC
- Hegesias of Cyrene, Cyrenaic philosopher, c. 300 BC
- Hegesias of Magnesia, Greek rhetorician and historian, c. 300 BC
- Hegesias or Hegesinus of Salamis, sometimes said to be the author of the lost epic Cypria
- Hegesias or Hegias of Athens, sculptor or possibly two sculptors of the generation before Phidias
- Hegias, Neoplatonist philosopher, c. 500 AD
