= Apollodorus of Seleucia =

2nd-century BC Stoic philosopher

Apollodorus of Seleucia (Greek: Ἀπολλόδωρος; flourished c. 150 BC), or Apollodorus Ephillus, was a Stoic philosopher, and a pupil of Diogenes of Babylon.

Apollodorus is famous for describing Cynicism as "the short path to virtue", and he may have been the first Stoic after the time of Zeno and Aristo to systematically attempt to reconcile Stoicism with Cynicism. The lengthy account of Cynicism given by Diogenes Laërtius, which is presented from a Stoic point of view, may be derived from Apollodorus, and it is possible that he was the first Stoic to promote the idea of a line of Cynic succession from Socrates to Zeno (Socrates – Antisthenes – Diogenes – Crates – Zeno).

He wrote a number of handbooks (Greek: εἰσαγωγαί) on Stoicism, including ones on Ethics and Physics which are frequently cited by Diogenes Laërtius. His book on Physics was well known in ancient times, and the Stoic Theon of Alexandria wrote a commentary on it in the 1st century AD. It is quoted several times by Diogenes Laërtius, and Stobaeus records Apollodorus' views on the nature of time:

Time is the dimension of the world's motion; and it is infinite in just the way that the whole number is said to be infinite. Some of it is past, some present, and some future. But the whole of time is present, as we say that the year is present on a larger compass. Also, the whole of time is said to belong, though none of its parts belong exactly.
