= Metrocles =

Cynic philosopher

Metrocles of Maroneia
- Μητροκλῆς
- Born: c. 350 BC; Maroneia, Thrace
- Died: c. 280 BC

Philosophical work
- Era: Hellenistic philosophy
- Region: Western philosophy
- School: Cynicism

Metrocles (Ancient Greek: Μητροκλῆς; fl. c. 325 BC) was a Cynic philosopher from Maroneia. He studied in Aristotle’s Lyceum under Theophrastus, and eventually became a follower of Crates of Thebes, who married Metrocles’ sister Hipparchia. Very little survives of his writings, but he is important as one of the first Cynics to adopt the practice of writing moral anecdotes (chreiai) about Diogenes and other Cynics.

== Life ==
The supposed story of Metrocles' conversion to Cynicism is reported by Diogenes Laërtius. Metrocles had apparently farted while practicing a speech, and became so upset that he shut himself up in his home, attempting to commit suicide by starving himself. Crates visited him and made him a dinner of lupines, explaining to him that what he had done was according to nature and therefore nothing to be ashamed of. When Crates himself farted to demonstrate how natural it was, Metrocles was persuaded to let go of his shame.

Whether or not this story is true, the symbolism for the Cynics is that it demonstrated the worthlessness of Metrocles' education up until that time. As a pupil of Theophrastus he may have learned a lot of information, but he was still obsessed with social conventions and good manners, to the point of being ready to die from embarrassment. With Crates' help he was able to let go of his old ways and embrace a Cynic life free from convention, and find true happiness.

Equally significant is a passage preserved in the writings of Teles, who tells how Metrocles as a young student of the Lyceum and the Academy could not keep up with the extravagant life-style requirements:

When he was studying with Theophrastus and Xenocrates, although many things were being sent to him from home, he was in constant fear of dying from hunger and was always destitute and in want. But when he later changed over to Crates, he could feed even another person though nothing was sent from home. For in the former case he had to have shoes,... then a cloak, a following of slaves, and a grand house; for the common table he had to see that the breads were pure, the delicacies above the ordinary, the wine sweet, the entertainment appropriate, so that here there was much expense. For among them such a way of life was judged to be 'liberal.'

According to Hecato of Rhodes, Metrocles burned all his writings, but others said it was only the notes he took in the school of Theophrastus that he burned. It may have been via Metrocles that his sister Hipparchia met Crates, whom she later married, thus also becoming a Cynic. Plutarch represents Metrocles as sleeping in the winter amongst sheep, and in the summer in the porches of temples. He apparently knew the Megarian philosopher Stilpo and disputed with him, and Stilpo wrote a dialogue called Metrocles. In his biography of Metrocles, Diogenes Laërtius seemingly lists a number of his pupils, but the list probably refers to Crates. Metrocles died at a great age, and is said to have deliberately suffocated himself.

== Writings ==
Metrocles was a man of great ability, and wrote several works, but little of his thought survives. He objected to wealth unless it was put to good use; and he divided things into those that can be bought with money (such as a house), and those that take time and care, like education. One of his works was called Chreiai (Greek: Χρεῖαι), that is, Anecdotes, or Maxims. Thus he became one of the first to contribute to the most important literary art-form for the Cynics: thousands of anecdotes were accumulated (and invented) concerning Diogenes, Crates and other Cynics, all of them providing moral messages through the actions of the Cynics. An anecdote written by Metrocles concerning Diogenes is preserved by Laërtius:

On one occasion Diogenes went with his head half-shaved into an entertainment of young men, as Metrocles tells us in his Chreiai, and so was beaten by them. And afterwards he wrote the names of all those who had beaten him, on a white tablet, and went about with the tablet round his neck, so as to expose them to insult, as they were generally condemned and reproached for their conduct.
