= Teles of Megara =

3rd century BCE Greek philosopher

Teles of Megara (Ancient Greek: Τέλης; fl. c. 235 BC), was a Cynic philosopher and teacher. He wrote various discourses (diatribes), seven fragments of which were preserved by Stobaeus.

== Life ==
The little information known about Teles comes solely from his writings. In his discourse On Exile he refers to events in the Chremonidean War in the 260s BC, and he makes a specific reference to Hippomedon's governorship in Thrace under Ptolemy III Euergetes in the years following 241 BC, thus this discourse was written shortly after this date. His native city is uncertain: he makes various indirect references to Megara which show that he was living and teaching there, but it is possible that he originally came from Athens. In Megara, Teles operated a school where he taught Cynicism, selecting teachings from earlier philosophers and dispensing them to his pupils.

== Work ==
Seven extracts of the lectures of Teles, totalling about thirty pages, are preserved by Stobaeus, although Stobaeus' own selections come from an earlier epitome by an otherwise unknown Theodorus. Thus, what survives is a series of extracts from extracts, and it is quite possible that in between Teles and Theodorus, or Theodorus and Stobaeus, the writings went through a further editing process. The seven extracts are:

1. Περὶ τοῦ δοκεῖν καὶ τοῦ εἶναι – On Seeming and Being
2. Περὶ αὐταρκείας – On Self-Sufficiency
3. Περὶ φυγῆς – On Exile
4. Σύγκρασις πενίας καὶ πλούτου – A Comparison of Poverty and Wealth
5. Περὶ τοῦ μὴ εἶναι τέλος ἡδονήν – On Pleasure not being the Goal of Life
6. Περὶ περιστάσεων – On Circumstances
7. Περὶ ἀπαθείας – On Freedom from Passion

As a writer Teles has been regarded as being deficient in both literary and logical virtues, but this may reflect the way in which his works have been edited and compressed by Theodorus, Stobaeus, and others. The value of his writings lies in the fact that they are the earliest Cynic discourses (diatribes) to survive, and they provide an insight into the Hellenistic world in which Teles lived. His works make frequent mention of Socrates and Diogenes, and he preserves important fragments from the works of Crates of Thebes, Metrocles, Stilpo and Bion of Borysthenes. Without him we would know little about the Cynic diatribe in the 3rd-century BC, and we would know much less about Bion.
