= Simmias of Syracuse =

Simmias (early 3rd century BC) of Syracuse, Magna Graecia, is mentioned by Diogenes Laërtius as a pupil, first of Aristotle of Cyrene, and afterwards of Stilpo, the Megarian philosopher. He was married to Stilpo's daughter. Nothing further is known of him.
