= Monimus =

Ancient Greek philosopher

Monimus of Syracuse
- Μόνιμος
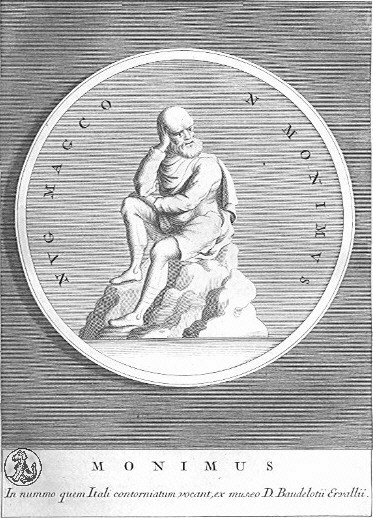
- Monimus of Syracuse
- Born: c. 4th century BC; Syracuse, Sicily

Philosophical work
- Era: Ancient philosophy
- Region: Ancient Greek philosophy
- School: Cynicism
- Main interests: Problem of the criterion
- Notable ideas: All is vanity ("typhos")

Monimus (/ˈmɒnɪməs/; Ancient Greek: Μόνιμος; 4th century BC) of Syracuse, Magna Graecia, was a Cynic philosopher, and a notable student of Diogenes.

== Biography ==
According to Diogenes Laërtius, Monimus was the slave of a Corinthian money-changer who heard tales about Diogenes of Sinope from Xeniades, Diogenes' master. In order that he might become the pupil of Diogenes, Monimus feigned madness by throwing money around until his master discarded him. Monimus also became acquainted with Crates of Thebes. Menander claimed that Monimus held three beggar's wallets instead of one; this may have been intended to imply that Monimus was three times as much of a Cynic as others, or might have been a satire implying that he was more fond of money than was considered proper for a Cynic philosopher.

== Philosophy ==
According to both Diogenes Laërtius and Sextus Empiricus, Monimus abolished the criterion, meaning that he rejected the idea that there was any standard of judgment for attaining knowledge. According to Sextus Empiricus, Monimus was like Anaxarchus because they "compared existing things to a scene-painting and supposed them to resemble the impressions experienced in sleep or madness." Monimus was famous for saying that "everything is vanity" (τῦφος, tuphos, literally 'mist' or 'smoke'). In book two of Meditations, Marcus Aurelius writes:

There is obvious truth to the Cynic Monimus' statement that 'all is opinion'; and obvious, too, is the usefulness of this statement if a man profits from it insofar as it is true.

According to Stobaeus, Monimus also said that "it was better to lack sight than education, because under the first affliction, you fall to the ground, under the latter, deep underground," and that "Wealth is the vomiting of Fortune."

== Works ==
According to Diogenes Laërtius, Monimus wrote two books: On Impulses, and an Exhortation to Philosophy, and he also wrote some jests mixed with serious themes (presumably related to Cynic-style spoudogeloia). Another work by Monimus, A Collection of Wonderful Events, is quoted by Clement of Alexandria.
