= Cleomenes the Cynic =

Late 4th/early 3rd century Greek philosopher

Cleomenes (/kliːˈɒmɪniːz/; Ancient Greek: Κλεομένης; fl. c. 300 BCE) was a Cynic philosopher. He was a pupil of Crates of Thebes, and is said to have taught Timarchus of Alexandria and Echecles of Ephesus, the latter of whom would go on to teach Menedemus.

He wrote a work on Pedagogues (Παιδαγωγικός) from which Diogenes Laërtius has preserved an anecdote concerning Diogenes of Sinope:

Cleomenes in his work on Pedagogues says that Diogenes' friends wanted to ransom him, for which he called them simpletons, for, he said, lions are not the slaves of those who feed them, but rather those who feed them are at the mercy of the lions, Fear, he added, is the mark of the slave, whereas wild beasts make human beings afraid of them.

The importance of this anecdote is that it is an early reference to the story of Diogenes being captured by pirates and being sold into slavery, lending credence to the idea that the story may well be true.
