= Horus (athlete) =

Horus (Ancient Greek: Ὦρος; fl. 4th century) was an Egyptian Cynic philosopher and Olympic boxer, who was victorious at the Olympic games in Antioch in 364 AD.

He was born in Alexandria, son of one Valens; Horus was originally a student of rhetoric and an athlete and was a victor at the Ancient Olympic Games in Antioch in 364, probably as a boxer. Horus was also commended in that year, alongside his brother Phanes, to Maximus praefectus Aegypti, and Eutocius. He later turned to Cynic philosophy.

Horus appears as an interlocutor in Macrobius's Saturnalia, (dramatic date 384) and as a friend of Symmachus, who commended him to Nicomachus Flavianus.
