= Heraclius the Cynic =

Heraclius (Greek: Ἡράκλειος Herakleios; fl. 4th century AD) was a Cynic philosopher, against whom the emperor Julian wrote in his seventh oration. Julian relates how Heraclius delivered an allegorical fable before him, in which Heraclius took upon himself the part of Jupiter, and gave the emperor that of the god Pan. Although offended by this fable, and by the disrespect with which Heraclius mentioned the gods, Julian maintained his silence, fearing that he would appear paranoid if he imposed silence upon Heraclius, as well as for regard for the audience. The encounter occurred while Julian was in Constantinople. Julian later composed his long discourse to explain that a Cynic should be an enemy to all pretence and deception, and ought not to compose fables; or, if he will compose them, that they should at least be serious, instructive, and religious.

An incident in which Heraclius urged bold action to Procopius, a relative of Julian. is also notable. The historical context of the incident may have been when Procopius attempted (and, ultimately, failed) to seize the Roman Empire following the death of Jovian, Julian's successor.
