= Demonax =

2nd century Greek philosopher

Demonax (Greek: Δημώναξ, Dēmōnax, gen.: Δημώνακτος; c. AD 70 – c. 170) was a Greek Cynic philosopher. Born in Cyprus, he moved to Athens, where his wisdom, and his skill in solving disputes, earned him the admiration of the citizens. He taught Lucian, who wrote a Life of Demonax in praise of his teacher. When he died he received a magnificent public funeral.

== Life ==
The only source known for the life of Demonax is Lucian, who describes Demonax in glowing terms, in contrast to the disreputable Cynics whom Lucian reviled. He is not mentioned by any other contemporary writer. He is mentioned in the 5th century by Eunapius, but only because he knows of him from Lucian's work. It is possible, therefore, that Demonax is a character invented by Lucian. There are, however, some sayings attributed to Demonax found in anthologies compiled by later writers which are not found in Lucian's work.

Demonax was born c. 70 AD, in Cyprus, where he belonged to an influential family. He was led by a love of philosophy to become a philosopher. He was taught by the best philosophers of the day, including Agathobulus, Demetrius, and Epictetus. He eventually moved to Athens, where he seems initially to have offended the citizens, but eventually he came to be regarded with reverence for his resolute character:

To a natural impulse towards the good, an innate yearning for philosophy which manifested itself in childish years, that he owed his superiority to all the things that ordinary men pursue. He took independence and candour for his guiding principles, lived himself an upright, wholesome, irreproachable life, and exhibited to all who saw or heard him the model of his own disposition and philosophic sincerity.

He is described as a peace-maker, able to bring harmony between husband and wife, and to solve disputes between brothers. Lucian compares him to both Socrates and Diogenes, and when Demonax was asked which philosophers he preferred, he is said to have replied, "I admire them all; Socrates I revere, Diogenes I admire, Aristippus I love."

When Demonax was once asked why he never sacrificed to Athena, he replied, "he did not sacrifice to Athena, because she could not want his offerings." Similarly, he avoided initiation into the Eleusinian Mysteries, saying, "if the mysteries were bad, no one ought to be initiated; if good, they should be divulged to everybody."

He apparently lived to be nearly a hundred, by which time the Athenians loved him dearly:

Not Athens only, but all Greece was so in love with him that as he passed the great would give him place and there would be a general hush. Towards the end of his long life he would go uninvited into the first house that offered, and there get his dinner and his bed, the household regarding it as the visit of some heavenly being which brought them a blessing. When they saw him go by, the baker-wives would contend for the honour of supplying him, and a happy woman was the actual donor. Children too used to call him father, and bring him offerings of fruit.

He was said to have died (c. 170 AD) by starving himself, and the Athenians gave him a magnificent public funeral.

The crater Demonax on the Moon is named after him. Demonax is also a genus of longicorn beetles (Cerambycidae), characterised in part by possessing several spines on their antennae.

== Lucian's Life of Demonax ==
Most of Lucian's account of Demonax is filled with pithy sayings in order to illustrate Demonax's wit. Long lists of anecdotes (known as chreia), were often collected concerning philosophers, especially Cynic philosophers, in order to demonstrate their character and wit:

When he once had a winter voyage to make, a friend asked how he liked the thought of being capsized and becoming food for fishes. "I should be very unreasonable to mind giving them a meal, considering how many they have given me."

To a rhetorician who had given a very poor declamation he recommended constant practice. "Why, I am always practising to myself," said the man. "Ah, that accounts for it; you are accustomed to such a foolish audience."

When someone asked him who he thinks as a truly happy man, he replied "the truly happy man is the free man. I'm talking about the one who neither hopes nor fears anything."

When another person kept himself shut up in the dark, mourning his son, Demonax represented himself to him as a magician: he would call up the son’s ghost, the only condition being that he should be given the names of three people who had never had to mourn. The father hum’d and ha’d, unable, doubtless, to produce any such person, till Demonax broke in: ‘And have you, then, a monopoly of the unendurable, when you cannot name a man who has not some grief to endure?’(compare the story of Kisa Gotami).
