= Nicarete of Megara =

Ancient Greek philosopher and/or hetaira

Nicarete or Nicareta of Megara (Ancient Greek: Νικαρέτη, Nikarétē) was a philosopher of the Megarian school, who flourished around 300 BC. She is stated by Athenaeus to have been a hetaera of good family and education, and to have been a disciple of Stilpo. Diogenes Laërtius states that she was Stilpo's mistress, though he had a wife.
