= Theombrotus =

Theombrotus (Ancient Greek: Θεόμβροτος) was an ancient Greek philosopher of the Cynic school who is said to have thrown himself to his death from a high wall after reading Plato's work on the immortality of the soul and concluding that he would be better off in the next life.

Theombrotus, who was active in the 4th century BC, studied under Diogenes a founder of Cynic philosophy and controversial figure who criticized Plato and Socrates and preached poverty. Theombrotus in turn taught the philosophers Demetrius of Alexandria (who may have been his son), Echecles of Ephesus, Menedemus and Menippus of Sinope.
