= Aristotle of Cyrene =

Ancient Greek philosopher (fl. 325 BCE)

Aristotle of Cyrene (or Aristoteles, Greek: Ἀριστοτέλης; fl. 325 BC) was a Greek philosopher who may have belonged to the Cyrenaic school.

He was a native of Cyrene, and a contemporary of Stilpo. He taught Cleitarchus and Simmias of Syracuse before they became pupils of Stilpo. It has generally been assumed that Aristotle was a member of the Cyrenaic school, but this assumption is somewhat doubtful. According to Diogenes Laërtius, he wrote a work on the art of poetry. The only aspect of his philosophical views which is known is a short piece of ethical advice preserved by Aelian:

Aristoteles of Cyrene said that you should not accept a favor from anyone. For either you have trouble if you try to pay it back, or you appear to be ungrateful if you don't.

An athlete of the same period called Aristotle of Cyrene, who spurned the love of Lais, is mentioned in a moral anecdote by Clement of Alexandria.
