= Asclepiades the Cynic =

Cynic philosopher

Asclepiades (Greek: Ἀσκληπιάδης; fl. 4th century AD) was a Cynic philosopher. He is mentioned by the emperor Julian whom Asclepiades visited at Antioch in 362. Ammianus Marcellinus describes how Asclepiades accidentally destroyed the temple of Apollo at Daphne in Antioch:

The philosopher Asclepiades, whom I have mentioned in the history of Magnentius, when he had come to that suburb from abroad to visit Julian, placed before the lofty feet of the statue a little silver image of the Dea Caelestis, which he always carried with him wherever he went, and after lighting some wax tapers as usual, went away. From these tapers after midnight, when no one could be present to render aid, some flying sparks alighted on the woodwork, which was very old, and the fire, fed by the dry fuel, mounted and burned whatever it could reach, at however great a height it was.

The Dea Caelestis ("Heavenly Goddess") figurine, which Asclepiades always carried with him, was the Roman name for Tanit, the patron goddess of Carthage. Asclepiades was apparently still alive around 390, when a female relative of his was commended to Magnillus by Symmachus.

Another Cynic called Asclepiades, who must have lived at least two centuries earlier, is mentioned by Tertullian. He tells us that this Asclepiades inspected the world riding on the back of a cow, occasionally drawing milk from her udder.
