= Hegesias of Sinope =

Hegesias of Sinope was an ancient Greek philosopher of the Cynic school and a student of Diogenes, said to have been once scolded for asking to borrow his teacher's writing tablet.

Although little is known of the life of Hegesias, he is believed to have been active around 325 B.C. and have been known by the nickname "Dog Collar".
