= Menedemus the Cynic =

3rd century BC Greek Cynic philosopher

Menedemus (Greek: Μενέδημος; fl. 3rd century BC) was a Cynic philosopher, and a pupil of the Epicurean Colotes of Lampsacus. Diogenes Laërtius states that he used to go about garbed as a Fury, proclaiming himself a sort of spy from Hades:

He assumed the garb of a Fury, and went about saying that he had come from Hades to take notice of all who did wrong, in order that he might descend there again and make his report to the deities who live in that country. And this was his dress: a tunic of a dark colour reaching to his feet, and a purple girdle round his waist, an Arcadian hat on his head with the twelve signs of the zodiac embroidered on it, tragic buskins, a preposterously long beard, and an ashen staff in his hand.

However, Wilhelm Crönert argued that this story is actually derived from one of the satires (the Necromancy) of Menippus, and that parallels to this story can be found in the dialogues of Lucian, which are based on those of Menippus.

The claim that Menedemus was originally a pupil of Colotes of Lampsacus, on the other hand, may be true. Two papyri from Herculaneum show that Menedemus disputed with Colotes on Epicurean opinions concerning poetry.
