= Sallustius of Emesa =

Late Cynic philosopher

Sallustius (Greek: Σαλούστιος; fl. 5th century) of Emesa was a Cynic philosopher, who lived in the latter part of the 5th century AD.

== Biography ==
Sallustius' father Basilides was a Syrian; his mother Theoclea a native of Emesa, where probably Sallustius was born, and where he lived during the earlier part of his life. He applied himself first to the study of jurisprudence, and studied the art of oratory under the tuition of Eunoius at Emesa. He subsequently abandoned his forensic studies, and took up the profession of a sophist. He directed his attention especially to the Attic orators, and learnt all the orations of Demosthenes by heart. His own compositions were deemed not unworthy of the great models whom he imitated. Finding the instructions of Eunoius no longer of service to him, Sallustius travelled to Athens, and also to Alexandria (in the company of Isidore of Alexandria), studying in the schools of rhetoric. He subsequently gained a taste for philosophy, and after studying under the Neoplatonists, he took up with the doctrines of the Cynics, which he maintained thenceforward with great ardour. Simplicius tells us how Sallustius would "lay a red-hot coal upon his thigh, and blow the fire, to try to see how long he was able to undergo the pain." He assailed the philosophers of his time with considerable vehemence, to which his powers of ridicule gave additional effect. He pronounced philosophy to be an impossibility, and dissuaded the young men from resorting to the teachers of it. He employed his eloquence and wit in attacking the follies or vices of his contemporaries, and he managed to quarrel with Proclus himself. According to Photius, he pretended to a sort of divination or fortune-telling, professing to be able to tell from the appearance of a person's eyes what kind of death he would die. Sallustius was suspected of holding somewhat impious opinions regarding the gods. He seems at least to have been unsparing in his attacks upon the theology of the Neoplatonists.
