= Spoudaiogeloion =

Expression for the mixture of serious and comical stylistic elements

Spoudaiogeloion (Greek: σπουδαιογέλοιον) denotes the mixture of serious and comical elements stylistically. The word comes from the Greek σπουδαῖον spoudaion, "serious", and γελοῖον geloion, "comical".

The concept of the word, but not the word itself, first appears in Aristophanes's The Frogs (405 BC) lines 389–393, in a scene where the Chorus, who are devoted to Demeter, pray for victory: καὶ πολλὰ μὲν γελοῖά μ’ εἰπεῖν, πολλὰ δὲ σπουδαῖα, καὶ τὴς σὴς ἑορτὴς ἁείως παίσαντα καὶ σκώψαντα νικήσαντα ταινιούσθαι. (Allow me to say many things in jest and many things in seriousness, and, having sported and lampooned in a manner worthy of your feast, let me, victorious, win the victor's wreath.) The word was coined in the Old Comedy period.

Spoudaiogeloion was often used in satirical poems or folktales, which were funny, but had a serious, often ethical, theme. The serio-comic style became a rhetorical mainstay of the Cynics. The Romans gave it its own genre in the form of satire, contributed to most notably by the poets Horace and Juvenal. It was the most common tone of the works made by Menippus and Meleager of Gadara.

== Examples ==
- Satires 1 by Horace
