= Hipparchia of Maroneia =

Cynic philosopher

- Ἱππαρχία
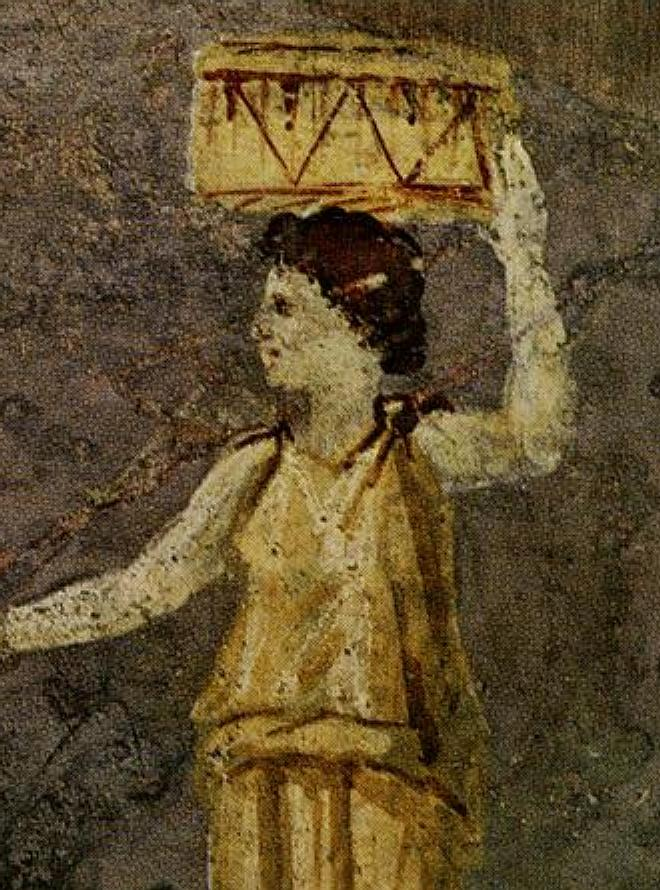
- Hipparchia leaves home to live as a philosopher, carrying all her possessions in a box. Detail from a Roman wall painting in the Villa Farnesina
- Born: c. 350 BC; Maroneia, Thrace
- Died: c. 280 BC
- Spouse: Crates of Thebes

Philosophical work
- Era: Ancient philosophy
- Region: Greek philosophy
- School: Cynicism

Hipparchia of Maroneia (/hɪˈpɑːrkiə/; Greek: Ἱππαρχία ἡ Μαρωνεῖτις; fl. c. 325 BC) was a Cynic philosopher, and wife of Crates of Thebes. She was the sister of Metrokles, the cynic philosopher. She was born in Maroneia, but her family moved to Athens, where Hipparchia came into contact with Crates, the most famous Cynic philosopher in Greece at that time. She fell in love with him, and, despite the disapproval of her parents, she married him. She went on to live a life of Cynic poverty on the streets of Athens with her husband.

Little survives of her own philosophical views, but like most Cynics, her influence lies in the example of her life, choosing a way of life which was usually considered unacceptable for respectable women of the time. The story of her attraction to Crates, and her rejection of conventional values, became a popular theme for later writers.

== Life ==
Hipparchia was born c. 350 BC in Maroneia, Thrace. Her family came to Athens, where Hipparchia's brother, Metrocles, became a pupil of the Cynic philosopher Crates of Thebes. Hipparchia fell in love with Crates, and developed such a passion for him, that she told her parents that if they refused to allow her to marry him, she would kill herself. They begged Crates to dissuade her, and he stood before her, removed his clothes, and said, "Here is the bridegroom, and this is his property." Hipparchia, however, was quite happy with this; she adopted the Cynic life assuming the same clothes that he wore, and appearing with him in public everywhere. Crates called their marriage "dog-coupling" (cynogamy; the term 'Cynic' is derived from Ancient Greek kŭ́ōn, 'dog'). We are told that they lived in the stoas and porticoes of Athens, and both Sextus Empiricus and the Latin-language writer Apuleius wrote accounts of their having sex, publicly, in broad daylight. Although this would have been consistent with Cynic shamelessness (anaideia), the mere fact that Hipparchia adopted male clothes and lived on equal terms with her husband would have been enough to shock Athenian society. Hipparchia had at least two children, a daughter, and a son named Pasicles. It is not known how or when she died. There is an epigram ascribed to Antipater of Sidon, as to what may have been written on her tomb:

I, Hipparchia chose not the tasks of rich-robed woman, but the manly life of the Cynic.
Brooch-clasped tunics, well-clad shoes, and perfumed headscarves pleased me not;
But with wallet and fellow staff, together with coarse cloak and bed of hard ground,
My name shall be greater than Atalanta: for wisdom is better than mountain running.

== Philosophy ==
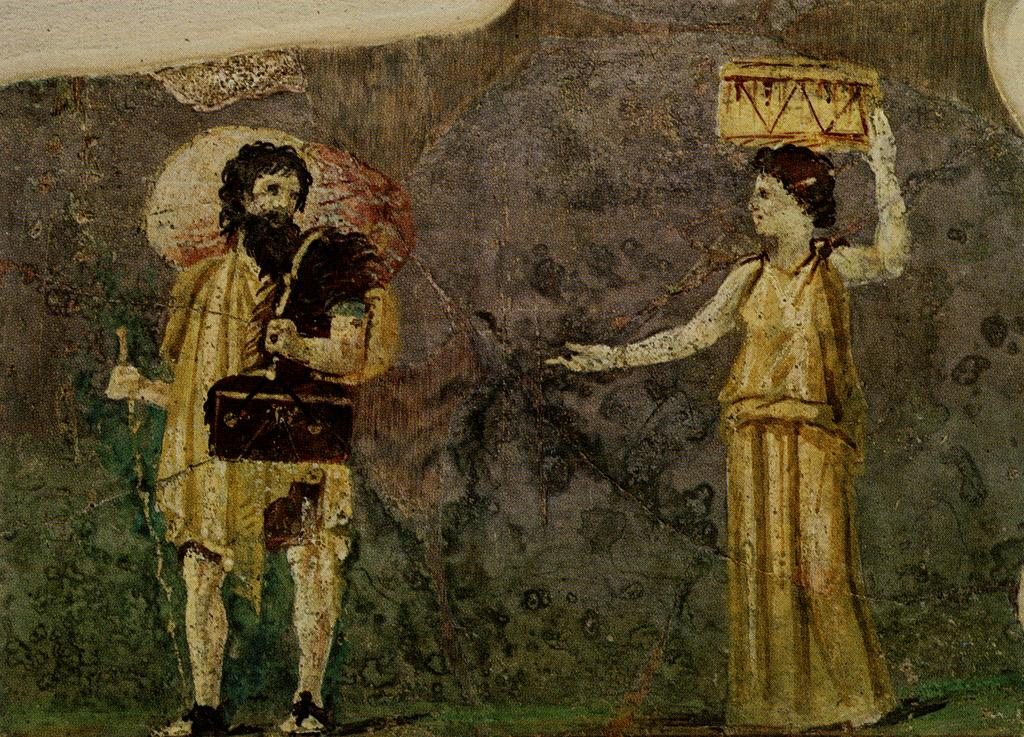
Roman wall painting of Hipparchia and Crates from the Villa Farnesina, Rome. Hipparchia approaches Crates carrying a box, implying that she has come to Crates as a potential bride bearing her possessions.

The Suda says she wrote some philosophical treatises and some letters addressed to Theodorus the Atheist. None of these have survived. There are some accounts of her encounters with Theodorus:

When she went into a symposium with Crates, she tested Theodoros the atheist by proposing a sophism like this: "That which if Theodoros did, he would not be said to do wrong, neither should Hipparchia be said to do wrong if she does it. Theodoros hitting himself does not do wrong, nor does Hipparchia do wrong hitting Theodoros." He did not reply to what she said, but pulled up her garment.

We are told she was neither offended nor ashamed by this "as most women would have been." We are also told that when Theodorus (quoting a line from The Bacchae of Euripides) said to her: "Who is the woman who has left behind the shuttles of the loom?" she replied

I, Theodorus, am that person, but do I appear to you to have come to a wrong decision, if I devote that time to philosophy, which I otherwise should have spent at the loom?"

Many other anecdotes existed about Hipparchia, but they have been mostly lost. We know also that Crates taught Zeno of Citium; it is impossible to say what influence Hipparchia had on Zeno in his development of Stoicism, but Zeno's own radical views on love and sex (as evidenced in his Republic) may have been influenced by the relationship of Hipparchia and Crates.

== Later influence ==
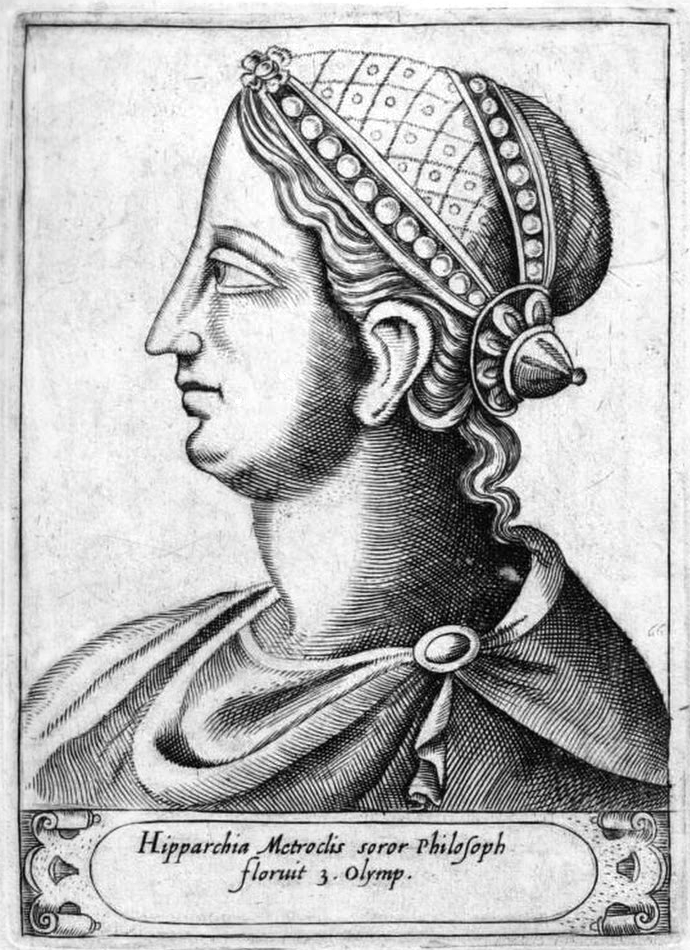
Engraving from 1580

Hipparchia's fame undoubtedly rests on the fact that she was a woman practising philosophy and living a life on equal terms with her husband. Both facts were unusual for ancient Greece or Rome. Although there were other women who chose to live as Cynics, Hipparchia is the only one whose name is known. She is also the only woman to have her own entry among the 82 philosophers in Diogenes Laërtius' Lives and Opinions of Eminent Philosophers, and she continued to fascinate later writers. There are, for example, a set of Cynic epistles, written in the 1st century AD, some of which purport to give advice from Crates to Hipparchia:

Our philosophy is called Cynic not because we are indifferent to everything, but because we aggressively endure what others, due to being soft or general opinion find unbearable. So it is for this reason and not the former that they have called us Cynics. Stay, therefore, and continue as a Cynic—for you are not by nature worse than we [men] are, for neither are female dogs worse than male—in order that you might be freed from Nature, as all [people] either because of law or due to vices, live as slaves.

Other letters mention events, which, like a lot of the Cynic epistles, may be based on actual anecdotes which existed at the time. In two of the letters, we are told that Hipparchia sent a cloak to Crates which she had made. Crates, though, fears that she may have undertaken the task "so that you might appear to the masses to be someone who loves her husband." Crates urges her to renounce wool-spinning and take-up philosophy since that is the reason she married him. In another letter, Crates learns why she has taken up domestic tasks: Hipparchia, we are told, has given birth. After agreeing with her that she gave birth easily because of her Cynic training, Crates proceeds to give advice on how to rear the child:

Let his bath water be cold, his clothes be a cloak, his food be milk, yet not to excess. Rock him in a cradle made from a tortoise shell. ... When he is able to speak and walk, dress him, not with a sword, as Aethra did with Theseus, but with a staff and cloak and wallet, which can guard men better than swords, and send him to Athens.

Perhaps most remarkable is a letter purporting to come from Diogenes of Sinope addressed to the people of Maroneia:

You did well when you changed the name of the city and, instead of Maroneia, called it Hipparchia, its present name, since it is better for you to be named after Hipparchia, a woman, it's true, but a philosopher, than after Maron, a man who sells wine.

== Modern influence ==
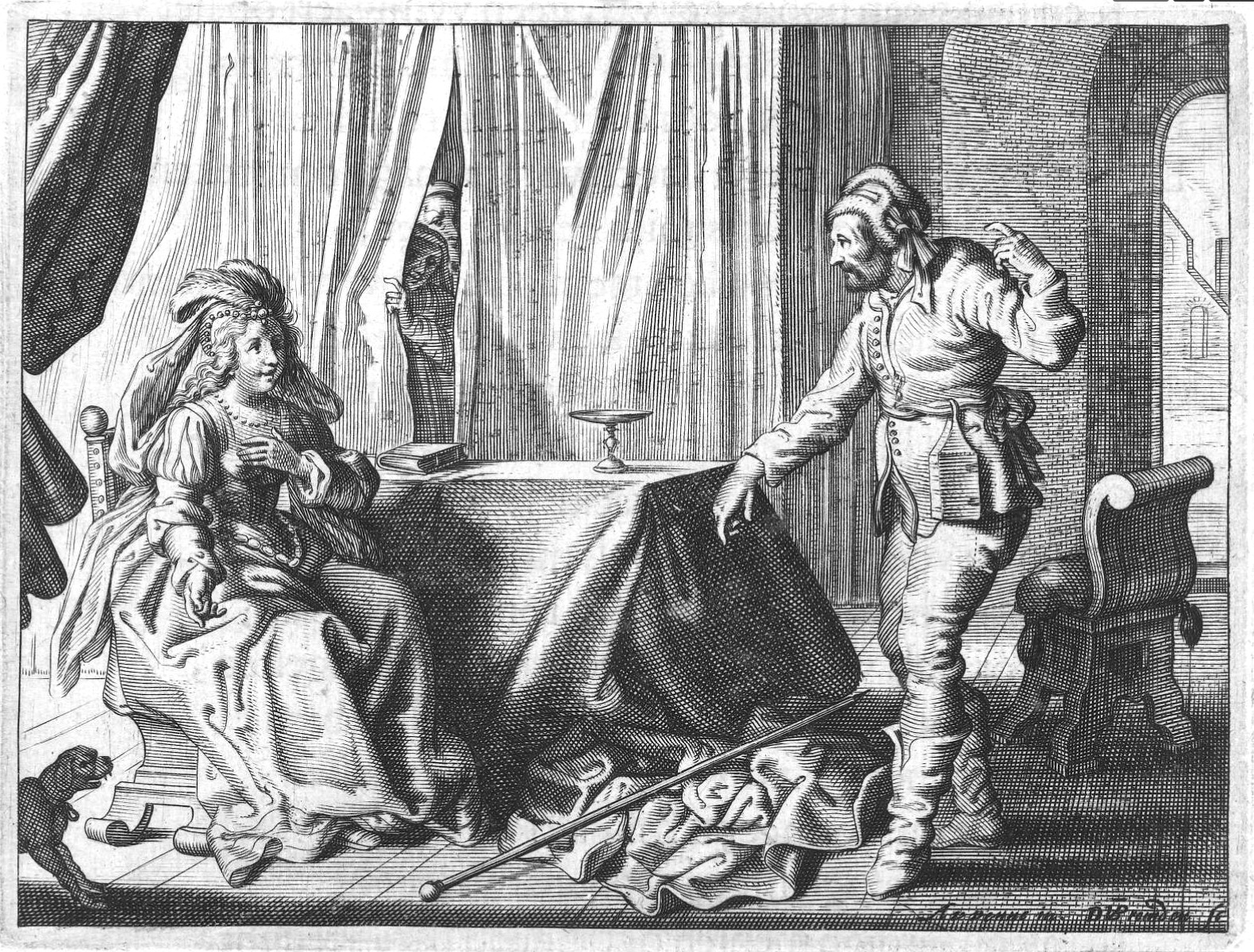
Engraving of Hipparchia and Crates from the Touchstone of the Wedding Ring by Jacob Cats. Depicted in 17th-century clothing, Crates tries to dissuade Hipparchia from her affections for him by pointing to his head to show how ugly he is

The story of Hipparchia's pursuit of Crates, despite the disapproval of her parents and the initial reluctance of Crates, was a popular tale from the 16th century onwards. It featured in Lodovico Guicciardini's commonplace book Hore di ricreatione published in 1568, and it was one of the stories told by the Dutch poet Jacob Cats in his Touchstone of the Wedding Ring (Proefsteen van de Trou-ringh) published in 1637. William Penn wrote about her in his No Cross, No Crown, which he wrote in prison in 1668. For Penn she was an example of puritan discipline and virtue:

I seek not the Pomp and Effeminacy of this World, but Knowledge and Virtue, Crates; and choose a Life of Temperance, before a Life of Delicacies: For true Satisfaction, thou knowest, is in the Mind; and that Pleasure is only worth seeking, that lasts for ever.

Her marriage to Crates inspired Pierre Petit to write the Latin poem Cynogamia, sive de Cratetis et Hipparches amoribus in 1676. In the same century, Clemenza Ninci, an Italian nun, wrote a play entitled Sposalizio d'Iparchia filosofa (The marriage of Hipparchia the philosopher). The play deals with Hipparchia's desire to marry Crates, and the obstacles which are placed in her way until she achieves her desire. The play was written for convent performance (with all the parts played by nuns) and was not published until the 19th century. The German writer Christoph Martin Wieland made Crates and Hipparchia the heroes of his epistolary novel Krates und Hipparchia (1804). Crates and Hipparchia feature in Marcel Schwob's Vies Imaginaires (Imaginary Lives, 1896). The American writer H.D. wrote a novella Hipparchia (1921), a highly fictionalised account of Hipparchia's daughter, (whom H.D. imagines is also called Hipparchia). Hipparchia was an inspiration for the book L'Étude et le rouet (1989) (translated in English under the title Hipparchia's Choice) by the French feminist philosopher Michèle Le Dœuff, a reflection on women's relation to philosophy. Martha Nussbaum, in her speech to the University of Chicago Law School graduating class of 2010, presented Hipparchia's life as an illustrative example of the benefits of continuing education beyond academic settings.

== Namesake ==
A genus of butterflies, Hipparchia, bears her name.

== Sources ==
- Laërtius, Diogenes, "The Cynics: Hipparchia" , Lives of the Eminent Philosophers, vol. 2:6, translated by Hicks, Robert Drew (Two volume ed.), Loeb Classical Library
- Long, A. A. (1996), "The Socratic Tradition: Diogenes, Crates, and Hellenistic Ethics", in Bracht Branham, R.; Goulet-Cazé, Marie-Odile (eds.), The Cynics: The Cynic Movement in Antiquity and Its Legacy, University of California Press, ISBN 0-520-21645-8
- Schofield, Malcolm (1991), The Stoic Idea of the City, Cambridge University Press, ISBN 0-226-74006-4
