= Cercidas =

3rd-century BC Greek poet and philosopher

Cercidas (Ancient Greek: Κερκιδᾶς Kerkidas; Fl. 3rd century BC) was a poet, Cynic philosopher, and legislator of his native city Megalopolis. A papyrus roll containing fragments from seven of his Cynic poems was discovered at Oxyrhynchus in 1906.

== Life ==
Cercidas was an admirer of Diogenes, whose death he recorded in some Meliambic lines. He is mentioned and cited by Athenaeus (who cites him as a source for the cult of Venus Kallipygos) and Stobaeus. At his death he ordered the first and second books of the Iliad to be buried with him. Aelian relates that Cercidas died expressing his hope of being with Pythagoras of the philosophers, Hecataeus of the historians, Olympus of the musicians, and Homer of the poets, which clearly implies his esteem for these four disciplines.

He commanded his city's infantry contingent at the battle of Sellasia in 222 BC. He appears to be a descendant of Cercidas the Arcadian, who is mentioned by Demosthenes among those Greeks, who, by their cowardice and corruption, enslaved their states to Philip II of Macedon.

In Sophists, Socratics and Cynics, D. Rankin notes that Cercidas “was active in the politics of his city…[and]…was appointed nomothetes, or legislative commissioner, with the task of drawing up a new constitution”. But in his poetry, he was a harsh critic of the wealthy, and called for justice and revenge (Nemesis) upon them, also invoking Fortune, asking why she didn't “reduce to poverty the profligate Xenon and give us the money now running to futility?”. He refers to the profligate wealthy as “dirty-cheat usurers” misusing their “stink-pig wealth”, as misers, and "ruin merchants". He invokes Justice and asks why she – and all the gods on Olympus – are so blind. But most significant is his invocation of Nemesis, “the spirit of earthly retribution” to attack the wealthy for their profligacy and to attack the system of wealth itself, rather than specific acts of injustice or inequality – a profound theme of the Cynics.

== Poetry ==
An Oxyrhynchus papyrus with the title "the meliambic poems of Cercidas the Cynic" (Greek: Κερκίδα κυνός μελίαμβοι) was discovered in 1906. Meliambic poetry, which is a style peculiar to Cercidas, is a combination of the iambic and hexameter meters. His poems are filled with moralistic themes such as the uneven distribution of wealth and the unfortunate results of luxurious living. There are seven poem fragments attributable to Cercidas. The longest fragment contains a discussion of the nature of the gods and of divine providence, in which Cercidas declares that the current beliefs do not square with the facts of life:

[why did God not] choose that greedy cormorant wealthpurse,

that sweet-scented out-of-control Xenon, make him a pathetic poor man,
and transfer to us who deserve it the silver that now
is uselessly flowing away? What can there be to prevent god -
supposing you asked him the question - since a god,
whatever comes into his mind, can easily get it all done,
if a man is a turd of a loan-shark, a real old die-for-a-penny
who squanders it all out again, one who's the death of his fortune,
why can't God just empty this man of his swinewealth,
and give to a thin-feeding, common-bowl cup-dipper

all the man's damned expenditure? Has the eye of Justice been mole-blinded?

Cercidas goes on to explain that he would rather leave the gods to the astrologers, and worship the tried Paean, Giving, and Retribution, that is, beneficence for those afflicted in body or spirit and punishment for wrongdoers. Another poem is erotic, teaching the cheap and easy way of love. Another fragment, apparently biographical, expressing the poet's satisfaction that he has devoted himself to the service of the Muses all his life.

In addition to these poems, there are also some papyrus fragments of a moral anthology with an introduction in choliambics, which can be dated to the 3rd century BC. It is possible that the anthology was compiled by Cercidas, but this is doubtful because the quality of the choliambic poetry in the introduction is much inferior to his meliambic poetry.
