= Simmias (explorer) =

Greek officer (third century BCE)

Simmias was a Greek officer in the service of Ptolemy III Euergetes, king of Egypt, who was sent by him to explore the shores of the Red Sea and the coasts of Ethiopia. Much of the information recorded by the geographer Agatharchides was derived from his authority.

== See also ==
- Hippalus
- Eudoxus of Cyzicus
- Periplus of the Erythraean Sea
