= Crates of Thebes =

Cynic philosopher

- Κράτης
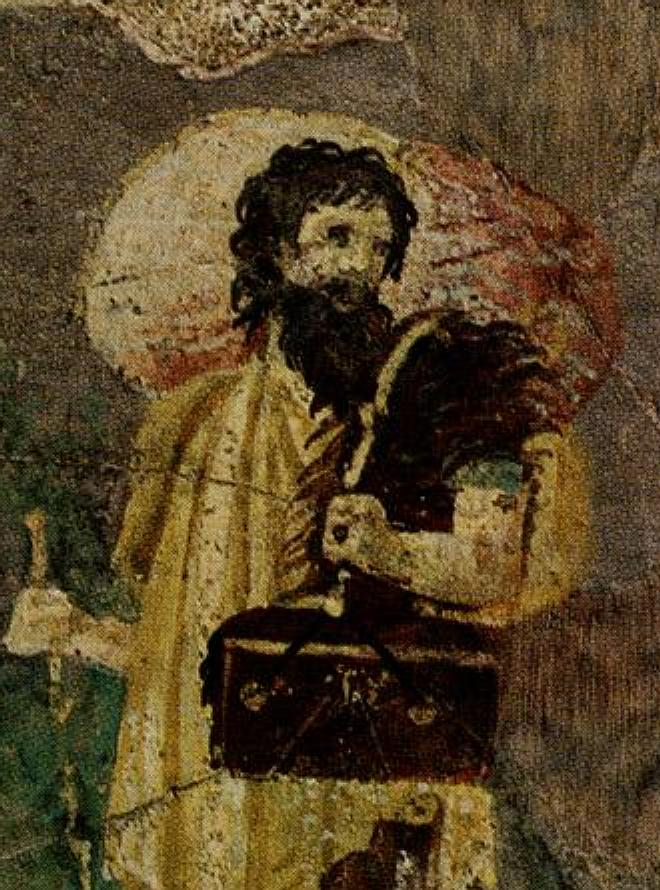
- Crates of Thebes. Detail from a Roman wall painting in the Villa Farnesina in Rome.
- Born: c. 365 BC; Thebes
- Died: c. 285 BC (aged 80); Boeotia
- Spouse: Hipparchia of Maroneia

Philosophical work
- Era: Hellenistic philosophy
- Region: Western philosophy
- School: Cynicism
- Main interests: Cynicism, Asceticism

Crates (Ancient Greek: Κράτης ὁ Θηβαῖος; c. 365 – c. 285 BC) of Thebes was a Greek Cynic philosopher, the principal pupil of Diogenes of Sinope and the husband of Hipparchia of Maroneia who lived in the same manner as he. Crates gave away his money to live a life of poverty on the streets of Athens. Respected by the people of Athens, he is remembered for being the teacher of Zeno of Citium, the founder of Stoicism. Various fragments of Crates' teachings survive, including his description of the ideal Cynic state.

== Life ==
Crates was born c. 365 BC in Thebes. He was the son of Ascondus, and was the heir to a large fortune, which he is said to have renounced to live a life of Cynic poverty in Athens. Diogenes Laërtius preserves several different accounts of this story; one of them has Crates giving his money away to the citizens of Thebes, apparently after seeing the beggar king Telephus in a tragedy; whereas another account has him placing his money in the hands of a banker, with the agreement that he should deliver it to his sons, unless they too became philosophers, in which case he should distribute it among the poor.

He moved to Athens where tradition says he became a pupil of Diogenes of Sinope; the precise relationship between Crates and Diogenes is uncertain, but there is one apparent reference to Crates referring to himself as "a fellow-citizen of Diogenes, who defied all the plots of envy". Crates is also described as being the student of Bryson the Achaean, and of Stilpo. He lived a life of cheerful simplicity, and Plutarch, who wrote a detailed biography of Crates which does not survive, records what sort of man Crates was:

But Crates with only his wallet and tattered cloak laughed out his life jocosely, as if he had been always at a festival.

He is said to have been deformed with a lame leg and hunched shoulders. He was nicknamed the Door-Opener (Greek: θυρεπανοίκτης) because he would enter any house and people would receive him gladly and with honour:

He used to enter the houses of his friends, without being invited or otherwise called, in order to reconcile members of a family, even if it was apparent that they were deeply at odds. He would not reprove them harshly, but in a soothing way, in a manner which was non-accusatory towards those whom he was correcting, because he wished to be of service to them as well as to those who were just listening.

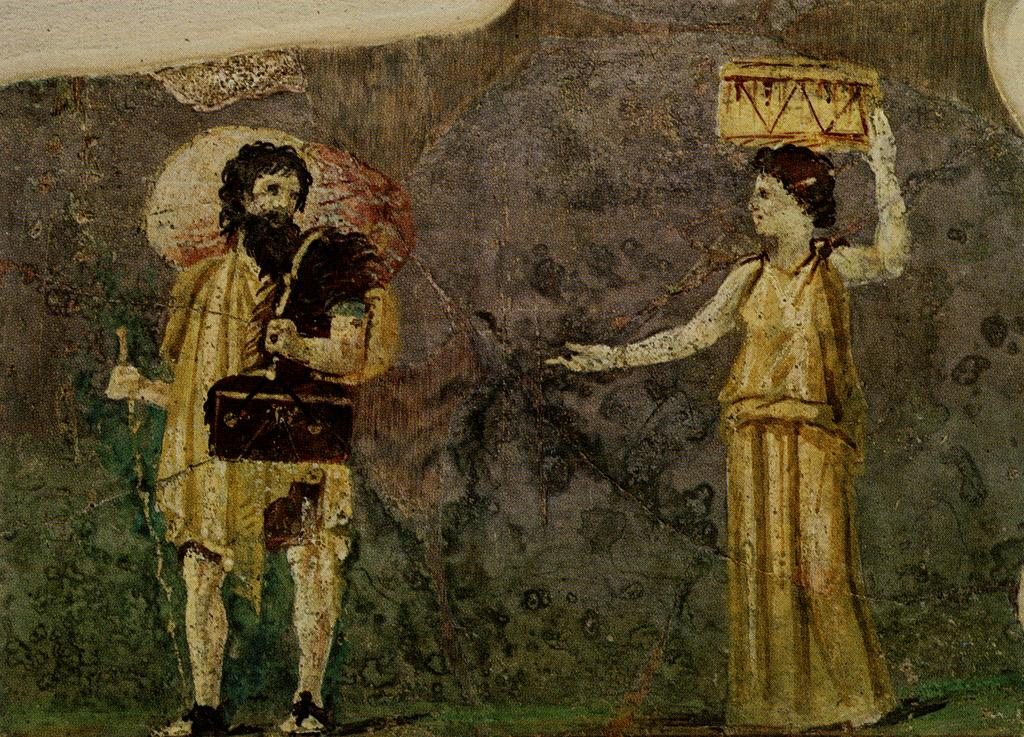
Roman wall painting of Crates and Hipparchia from the Villa Farnesina, Rome. Crates is shown with a staff and satchel, being approached by Hipparchia bearing her possessions in the manner of a potential bride.

He attracted the attentions of Hipparchia of Maroneia, the sister of one of Crates' students, Metrocles. Hipparchia is said to have fallen in love with Crates and with his life and teachings, and thus rejecting her wealthy upbringing in a manner similar to Crates, she married him. The marriage was remarkable (for ancient Athens) for being based on mutual respect and equality between the couple. Stories about Hipparchia appearing in public everywhere with Crates are mentioned precisely because respectable women did not behave in that way, and as part of Cynic shamelessness, they had sexual intercourse in public. They had at least two children, a girl, and a boy named Pasicles. We learn that Crates is supposed to have initiated his son into sex by taking him to a brothel, and he allowed his daughter a month's trial marriage to potential suitors.

He was the teacher of Zeno of Citium in the last years of the century, and was undoubtedly the biggest influence on Zeno in his development of Stoic philosophy. Zeno always regarded Crates with the greatest respect, and some of the accounts we have of Crates have probably come down to us via Zeno's writings. His other pupils included Metrocles, Monimus, Menippus, Cleomenes, Theombrotus, and Crates' brother Pasicles. He may also have taught Cleanthes, Zeno's successor as head of the Stoic school.

Crates was, apparently, in Thebes in 307 BC, when Demetrius Phalereus was exiled there. He is said to have died at a great age (c. 285 BC), and was buried in Boeotia.

== Philosophy ==
According to Diogenes Laërtius, Crates wrote a book of letters on philosophical subjects, the style of which Diogenes compares to that of Plato; but these no longer survive. There are 36 surviving Cynic epistles attributed to Crates, but these are later, 1st-century, compositions.

Crates was also the author of some philosophical tragedies, and some smaller poems apparently called Games (Ancient Greek: Παίγνια, romanized: Paignia).

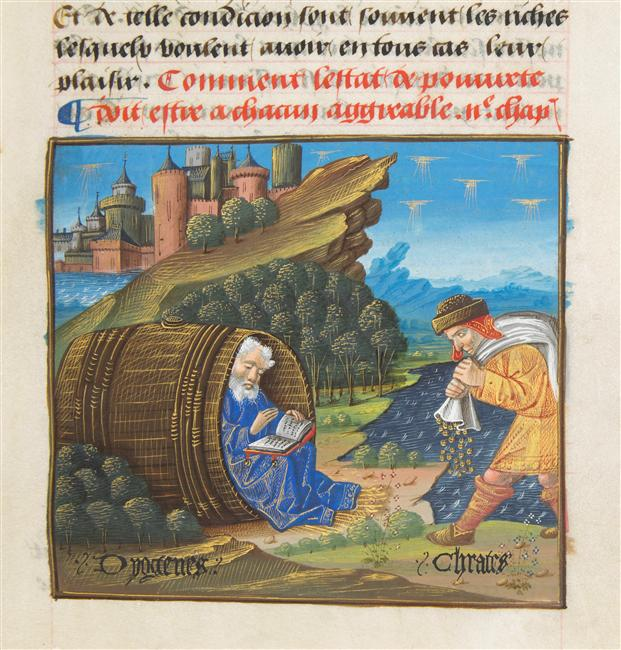
"Diogenes in his barrel and Crates of Thebes who gives up wealth for virtue." 15th-century manuscript.

Several fragments of his thought survive. He taught a simple asceticism, which seems to have been milder than that of his predecessor Diogenes:

And therefore Crates replied to the man who asked, "What will be in it for me after I become a philosopher?" "You will be able," he said, "to open your wallet easily and with your hand scoop out and dispense lavishly instead of, as you do now, squirming and hesitating and trembling like those with paralyzed hands. Rather, if the wallet is full, that is how you will view it; and if you see that it is empty, you will not be distressed. And once you have elected to use the money, you will easily be able to do so; and if you have none, you will not yearn for it, but you will live satisfied with what you have, not desiring what you do not have nor displeased with whatever comes your way."

Some of his philosophical writings were infused with humour, in the form of spoudaiogeloion. He urged people not to prefer anything but lentils in their meals, because luxury and extravagance were the chief causes of seditions and insurrections in a city. This jest would later be the cause of much satire, as in book 4 of Athenaeus' Deipnosophistae where a group of Cynics sit down for a meal and are served course after course of lentil soup.

One of his poems parodied a famous hymn to the Muses written by Solon. But whereas Solon wished for prosperity, reputation, and "justly acquired possessions", Crates had typically Cynic desires:

Glorious children of Memory and Olympian Zeus,

Muses of Pieria, listen to my prayer!
Give me without ceasing food for my belly
Which had always made my life frugal and free from slavery. . . .
Make me useful to my friends, rather than agreeable.
As for money, I do not wish to amass conspicuous wealth,
But only seek the wealth of the beetle or the maintenance of the ant;
Nay, I desire to possess justice and to collect riches
That are easily carried, easily acquired, and are of great avail to virtue.
If I may but win these, I will propitiate Hermes and the holy Muses,

Not with costly dainties, but with pious virtues.

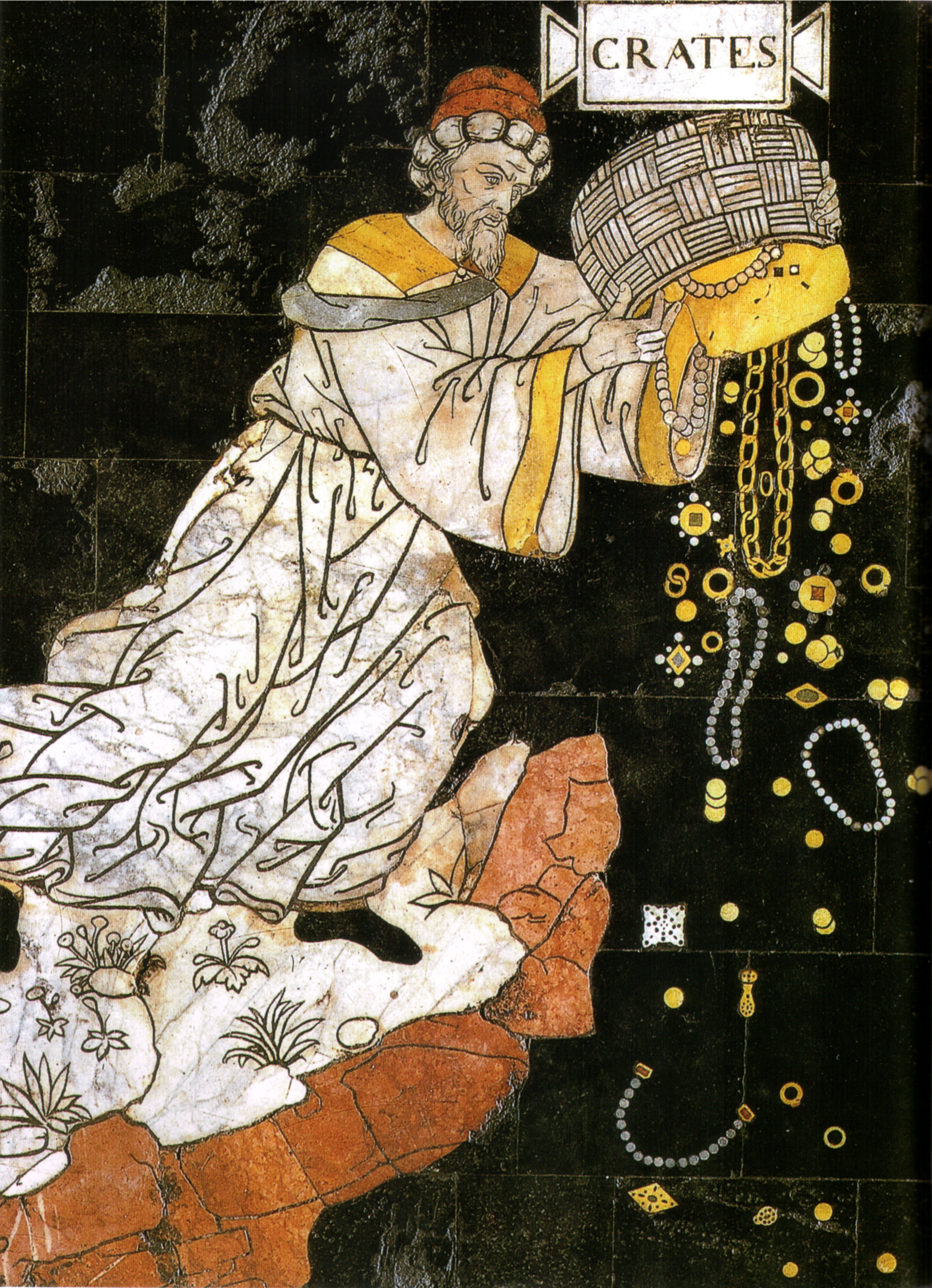
Crates disposes of his wealth. From the Allegory of the Hill of Wisdom, Siena Cathedral. Floor mosaic by Pinturicchio (c. 1505).

There are also several fragments surviving of a poem Crates wrote describing the ideal Cynic state which begins by parodying Homer's description of Crete. Crates' city is called Pera, which in Greek refers to the beggar's wallet which every Cynic carried:

There is a city Pera in the midst of wine-dark Tuphos,

Fair and fruitful, filthy all about, possessing nothing,
Into which no foolish parasite ever sails,
Nor any playboy who delights in a whore's ass,
But it produces thyme, garlic, figs, and bread,
For which the citizens do not war with each other,
Nor do they possess arms, to get cash or fame.

The word tuphos (Greek: τῦφος) in the first line, is one of the first known Cynic uses of a word which literally means mist or smoke. It was used by the Cynics to describe the mental confusion which most people are wrapped-up in. The Cynics sought to clear away this fog and to see the world as it really is.

== Later cultural references ==
The relationship between Crates and Hipparchia became the subject of a number of fictional accounts, such as the play Spozalizio d' Ipparchia filosofa, written by Italian nun Clemenza Ninci in the 17th century, or Christoph Martin Wieland's novel Krates und Hipparchia (1804). A fictional biography of Crates was written by French author Marcel Schwob in his 1896 work Vies imaginaires.

== Sources ==
- Dorandi, Tiziano (1999). "Chapter 2: Chronology". In Algra, Keimpe; et al. (eds.). The Cambridge History of Hellenistic Philosophy. Cambridge: Cambridge University Press. p. 52. ISBN 9780521250283.
- Laërtius, Diogenes. "The Seven Sages: Prologue" . Lives of the Eminent Philosophers. Vol. 1:1. Translated by Hicks, Robert Drew (Two volume ed.). Loeb Classical Library. § 1–21.
- Laërtius, Diogenes. "The Cynics: Monimus" . Lives of the Eminent Philosophers. Vol. 2:6. Translated by Hicks, Robert Drew (Two volume ed.). Loeb Classical Library. § 81–83.
- Laërtius, Diogenes (1925c). "The Cynics: Crates". Lives of the Eminent Philosophers. Translated by Hicks, Robert Drew (Two volume ed.). Loeb Classical Library. §85–93
- Laërtius, Diogenes. "The Cynics: Menedemus" . Lives of the Eminent Philosophers. Vol. 2:6. Translated by Hicks, Robert Drew (Two volume ed.). Loeb Classical Library. § 102–105.
- Laërtius, Diogenes. "The Stoics: Zeno" . Lives of the Eminent Philosophers. Vol. 2:7. Translated by Hicks, Robert Drew (Two volume ed.). Loeb Classical Library. § 1–160.
