= Crescens the Cynic =

2nd century Roman Cynic philosopher

Crescens (fl. 2nd century AD) was a Cynic philosopher who attacked the Christians, and was in turn attacked by Justin Martyr. Eusebius, writing 150 years later, accused him of causing Justin's death.

== Life ==
The only information regarding Crescens comes from hostile attacks by the Church Fathers. He was active, according to the Chronicon of Eusebius of Caesarea, around 152-153. Tatian refers to Crescens as being resident in the "great city", presumably Rome. According to Justin, Crescens attacked the Christians with great acrimony, calling them atheists:

Crescens, that lover of bravado and boasting; for the man is not worthy of the name of philosopher who publicly bears witness against us in matters which he does not understand, saying that the Christians are atheists and impious, and doing so to win favour with the deluded mob, and to please them.

Crescens called the Christians atheotatous, "the most atheist ones", and Justin admitted that the Christians were indeed atheists regarding their attitude toward the pagan gods. The atheotatous accusation seems to have been widespread within the pagan view of Christians, given that the Christians had no temples or statues of deities and did not perform sacrifices. This made the Christians comparable to other uncivilised peoples who had no gods either, such as the barbaric Scythians or nomadic Libyans. The charge had a long life and survived even into the fourth century.

Crescens was interrogated by Justin, who states that, in consequence, he was apprehensive that Crescens might plot against him. Tatian, in a discourse written around the same time, asserted that Crescens "surpassed all men in his love-of-boys (paiderastia) and was strongly addicted to the love of money". He then claimed that Crescens "who professed to despise death, was so afraid of death, that he endeavoured to inflict on Justin, and indeed on me, the punishment of death, as being an evil." Eusebius even claimed that Justin's martyrdom (c. 165) was in fact caused by Crescens, but the only evidence he advanced were the statements of Tatian, who makes no claim that Justin met his death as a direct result of the plots of Crescens.
