= Demetrius the Cynic =

1st century Greco-Roman Cynic philosopher

Demetrius (Greek: Δημήτριος; fl. 1st century), a Cynic philosopher from Corinth, who lived in Rome during the reigns of Caligula, Nero and Vespasian (37–71 AD).

== Biography ==
Demetrius was the intimate friend of Seneca, who wrote about him often, and who describes him as the perfect man:

Demetrius, who seems to have been placed by nature in our times that he might prove that we could neither corrupt him nor be corrected by him; a man of consummate wisdom, though he himself disclaimed it, constant to the principles which he professed, of an eloquence worthy to deal with the mightiest subjects, scorning mere prettinesses and verbal niceties, but expressing with infinite spirit, the ideas which inspired it. I doubt not that he was endowed by divine providence with so pure a life and such power of speech in order that our age might neither be without a model nor a reproach.

His contempt for worldly riches is shown by his reply to Caligula who, wishing to corrupt him, offered him two hundred thousand sesterces. Demetrius replied, "If he meant to tempt me, he ought to have tried to do so by offering his entire kingdom."

He was also a friend of Thrasea Paetus and was with him when Thrasea was condemned to death (66 AD). We hear of him again in the reign of Vespasian (c. 70 AD), when he defended Publius Egnatius Celer against the charges brought against him by Musonius Rufus. He was exiled from Rome in 71 AD, by Vespasian, along with all other philosophers.

Demetrius is sometimes identified with the Demetrius of Sunium mentioned by Lucian. However, Demetrius was a very common name in the Roman world, and Demetrius of Sunium was probably, (but not certainly), a different, later Cynic.

== Quotations of Demetrius ==
- "An easy existence, untroubled by the attacks of Fortune is a Dead Sea"
- "The talk of the ignorant is like the rumblings which issue from the belly."
