= Robert Drew Hicks =

British classical scholar (1850–1929)

Robert Drew Hicks (29 June 1850 – 8 March 1929) was a classical scholar, and a fellow of Trinity College, Cambridge.

The son of William Hicks, head clerk in the post office at Bristol, Hicks was born in 1850, was educated at Bristol Grammar School, and entered Trinity College, Cambridge, in 1868. Graduating BA in 1874, he became a fellow of Trinity in 1876. He was college lecturer in classics from 1884 to 1900. He married Bertha Mary Heath in 1896, who herself held an MA in classics from the University of London. His brother-in-law was Sir Thomas Heath. Between 1898 and 1900 Robert Hicks became blind, but he nevertheless produced most of his major works after this time, aided by his wife. He died at his home, Fossedene, at Mount Pleasant, Cambridge, is buried at the Parish of the Ascension Burial Ground in Cambridge.

== Works ==
Hicks's writings include:

- a monumental edition of Aristotle's "De Anima" (1907)
- a small volume on the Stoics and Epicureans (1910)
- a summary of Greek philosophy for the Cambridge Companion to Greek Studies
- a concise Latin dictionary in Braille (1921)
- his text and translation of Diogenes Laërtius for the Loeb Classical Library (1925)
