= Menippus =

3rd-century BC Greek Cynic satirist

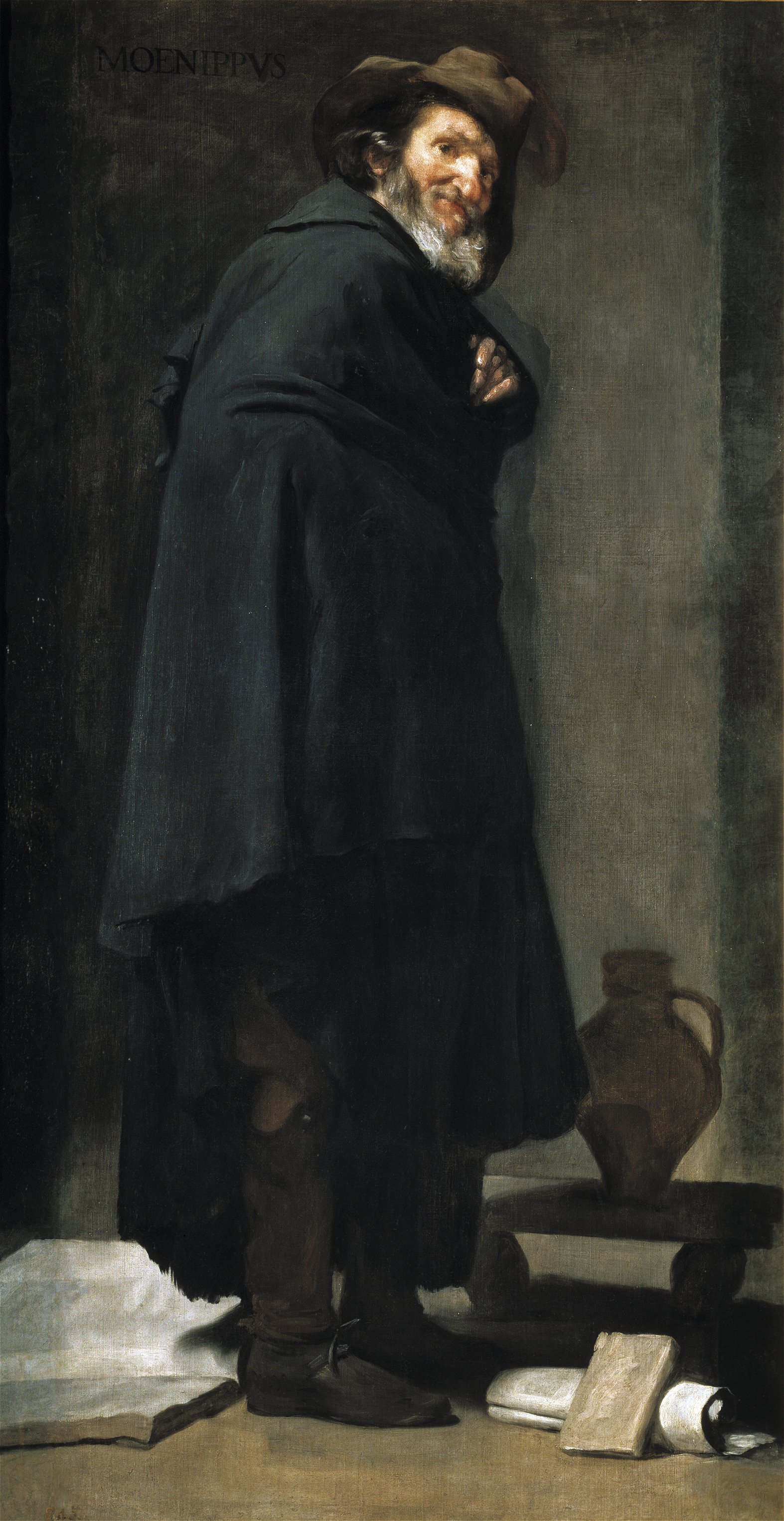
Menippus, by Velázquez

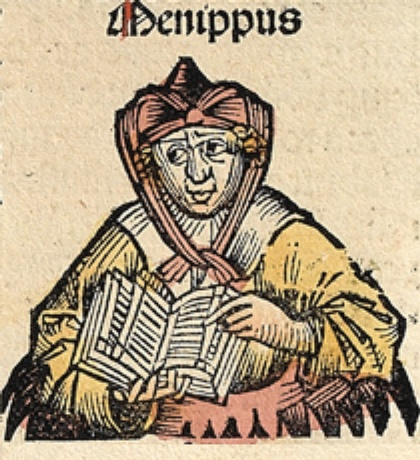
Menippus, Nuremberg Chronicle.

Menippus of Gadara (/məˈnɪpəs/; Greek: Μένιππος ὁ Γαδαρεύς Menippos ho Gadareus; fl. 3rd century BC) was a Cynic satirist. The Menippean satire genre is named after him. His works, all of which are lost, were an important influence on Varro and Lucian, who ranks Menippus with Antisthenes, Diogenes, and Crates as among the most notable of the Cynics.

== Life ==
Little is known about the life of Menippus. He was of Syro-Phoenician descent, from the Greek city of Gadara in Coele-Syria. He was originally a slave, in the service of a citizen of Pontus, but in some way obtained his freedom and relocated to Thebes. Diogenes Laërtius relates a dubious story that he amassed a fortune as a money-lender, lost it, and committed suicide.

== Writings ==
His works (written in a mixture of prose and verse) are all lost. He discussed serious subjects in a spirit of ridicule, and especially delighted in attacking the Epicureans and Stoics. Strabo and Stephanus call him the "earnest-jester" (Greek: σπουδογέλοιος, spoudogeloios). His writings exercised considerable influence upon later literature, and the Menippean satire genre is named after him. Although the writings of Menippus no longer survive, there are some fragments of Varro's Saturae Menippeae, which were written in imitation of Menippus. One of the dialogues attributed to Lucian, his avowed imitator, who frequently mentions him, is called Menippus, but since the sub-title ("The Oracle of the Dead") resembles that of a work ascribed to Menippus by Diogenes Laërtius, it has been suggested that it is imitated from his Necromancy.

Diogenes Laërtius says the following works were written by Menippus:

- Νέκυια – Necromancy
- Διαθῆκαι – Wills
- Ἐπιστολαὶ κεκομψευμέναι ἀπὸ τῶν θεῶν προσώπου – Letters artificially composed as if by the Gods
- Πρὸς τοὺς φυσικοὺς καὶ μαθηματικοὺς καὶ γραμματικοὺς – Replies to the Natural Philosophers, and Mathematicians, and Grammarians
- Γονὰς Ἐπικούρου – The Birth of Epicurus
- Τὰς θρησκευομένας ὑπ' αὐτῶν εἰκάδας – The School's reverence of the twentieth day (celebrated in the Epicurean school)

In addition, Athenaeus mentions works called Symposium and Arcesilaus, and Diogenes Laërtius mentions a Sale of Diogenes (Greek: Διογένους Πράσει) written by Menippus which seems to be the main source of the story that Diogenes of Sinope was captured by pirates and sold into slavery.
