= Cynicism (philosophy) =

Ancient school of philosophy

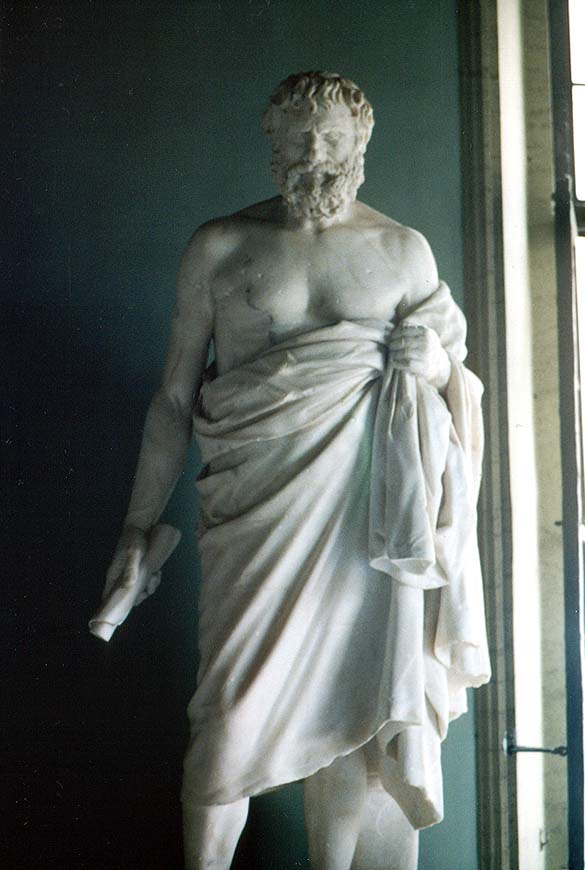
Statue of an unknown Cynic philosopher from the Capitoline Museums in Rome. This statue is a Roman-era copy of an earlier Greek statue from the third century BC. The scroll in his right hand is an 18th-century restoration.

Cynicism (Ancient Greek: κυνισμός) is a school of thought in ancient Greek philosophy, originating in the Classical period and extending into the Hellenistic and Roman Imperial periods. According to Cynicism, people are reasoning animals, and the purpose of life and the way to gain happiness is to achieve virtue, in agreement with nature, following one's natural sense of reason by living simply and shamelessly free from social constraints. The Cynics (Ancient Greek: Κυνικοί, Latin: Cynici) rejected all conventional desires for wealth, power, pleasure, glory, social recognition, conformity, and worldly possessions and even flouted such conventions openly and derisively in public.

The first philosopher to outline these themes was Antisthenes, who had been a pupil of Socrates in the late 400s BC. He was followed by Diogenes, who lived in a ceramic jar on the streets of Athens. Diogenes took Cynicism to its logical extremes with his famous public demonstrations of non-conformity, coming to be seen as the archetypal Cynic philosopher. He was followed by Crates of Thebes, who gave away a large fortune so he could live a life of Cynic poverty in Athens.

Cynicism gradually declined in importance after the 3rd century BC, but it experienced a revival with the rise of the Roman Empire in the 1st century. Cynics could be found begging and preaching throughout the cities of the empire, and similar ascetic and rhetorical ideas appeared in early Christianity. By the 19th century, emphasis on the negative aspects of Cynic philosophy led to the modern understanding of cynicism to mean an attitude of disbelief in the sincerity or goodness of human motives and actions.

== Origin of the Cynic name ==
The term cynic derives from Ancient Greek κυνικός (kynikos) 'dog-like' and κύων (kyôn) 'dog' (genitive: kynos). One explanation offered in ancient times for why the Cynics were called "dogs" was because the first Cynic, Antisthenes, taught in the Cynosarges gymnasium at Athens. The word cynosarges means the "place of the white dog". It seems certain, however, that the word dog was also thrown at the first Cynics as an insult for their shameless rejection of conventional manners, and their decision to live on the streets. Diogenes, in particular, was referred to as the "Dog", a distinction he seems to have revelled in, stating that "other dogs bite their enemies, I bite my friends to save them." Later Cynics also sought to turn the word to their advantage, as a later commentator explained:

There are four reasons why the Cynics are so named. First because of the indifference of their way of life, for they make a cult of indifference and, like dogs, eat and make love in public, go barefoot, and sleep in tubs and at crossroads. The second reason is that the dog is a shameless animal, and they make a cult of shamelessness, not as being beneath modesty, but as superior to it. The third reason is that the dog is a good guard, and they guard the tenets of their philosophy. The fourth reason is that the dog is a discriminating animal which can distinguish between its friends and enemies. So do they recognize as friends those who are suited to philosophy, and receive them kindly, while those unfitted they drive away, like dogs, by barking at them.

== Philosophy ==
Cynicism is one of the most striking of all the Hellenistic philosophies. It claimed to offer people the possibility of happiness and freedom from suffering in an age of uncertainty. Although there was never an official Cynic doctrine, the fundamental principles of Cynicism can be summarized as follows:

- The goal of life is eudaimonia and mental clarity or lucidity (ἁτυφια, atuphia)—literally "freedom from smoke (τύφος, tuphos)" which signified false belief, mindlessness, folly, and conceit.
- Eudaimonia, or human flourishing, depends on self-sufficiency (αὐτάρκεια, autarkeia), equanimity, arete, love of humanity, parrhesia, and indifference to the vicissitudes of life (adiaphora ἁδιαφορία).
- Eudaimonia is achieved by living in accord with Nature as understood by human reason.
- Arrogance (τύφος) is caused by false judgments of value, which cause negative emotions, unnatural desires, and a vicious character.
- One progresses towards flourishing and clarity through ascetic practices (ἄσκησις, áskēsis) which help one become free from influences such as wealth, fame, and power which have no value in Nature. Instead they promoted living a life of ponos. For the Cynics, this did not seem to mean actual physical work. Diogenes of Sinope, for example, lived by begging, not by doing manual labor. Rather, it means deliberately choosing a hard life—for instance, wearing only a thin cloak and going barefoot in winter.
- A Cynic practices shamelessness or impudence (Αναιδεια, Anaideia) and defaces the nomos of society: the laws, customs, and social conventions that people take for granted.

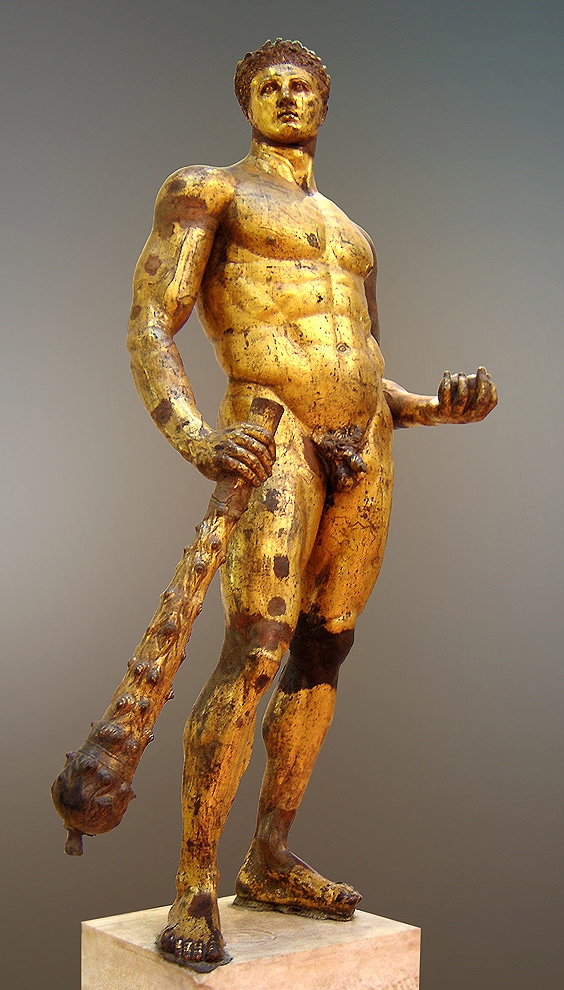
The Cynics adopted Heracles, shown here in this gilded bronze statue from the second century AD, as their patron hero.

Thus a Cynic has no property and rejects all conventional values of money, fame, power and reputation. A life lived according to nature requires only the bare necessities required for existence, and one can become free by unshackling oneself from any needs which are the result of convention. The Cynics adopted Heracles as their hero, as epitomizing the ideal Cynic. Heracles "was he who brought Cerberus, the hound of Hades, from the underworld, a point of special appeal to the dog-man, Diogenes." According to Lucian, "Cerberus and Cynic are surely related through the dog."

The Cynic way of life required continuous training, not just in exercising judgments and mental impressions, but a physical training as well:

[Diogenes] used to say, that there were two kinds of exercise: that, namely, of the mind and that of the body; and that the latter of these created in the mind such quick and agile impressions at the time of its performance, as very much facilitated the practice of virtue; but that one was imperfect without the other, since the health and vigour necessary for the practice of what is good, depend equally on both mind and body.

None of this meant that a Cynic would retreat from society. Cynics were in fact to live in the full glare of the public's gaze and be quite indifferent in the face of any insults which might result from their unconventional behaviour. The Cynics are said to have invented the idea of cosmopolitanism: when he was asked where he came from, Diogenes replied that he was "a citizen of the world, (kosmopolitês)."

The ideal Cynic would evangelise; as the watchdog of humanity, they thought it was their duty to hound people about the error of their ways. The example of the Cynic's life (and the use of the Cynic's biting satire) would dig up and expose the pretensions which lay at the root of everyday conventions. Although Cynicism concentrated primarily on ethics, some Cynics, such as Monimus, addressed epistemology with regard to tuphos (τῦφος) expressing skeptical views.

Cynic philosophy had a major impact on the Hellenistic world, ultimately becoming an important influence for Stoicism. The Stoic Apollodorus, writing in the 2nd century BC, stated that "Cynicism is the short path to virtue."

== History of Cynicism ==
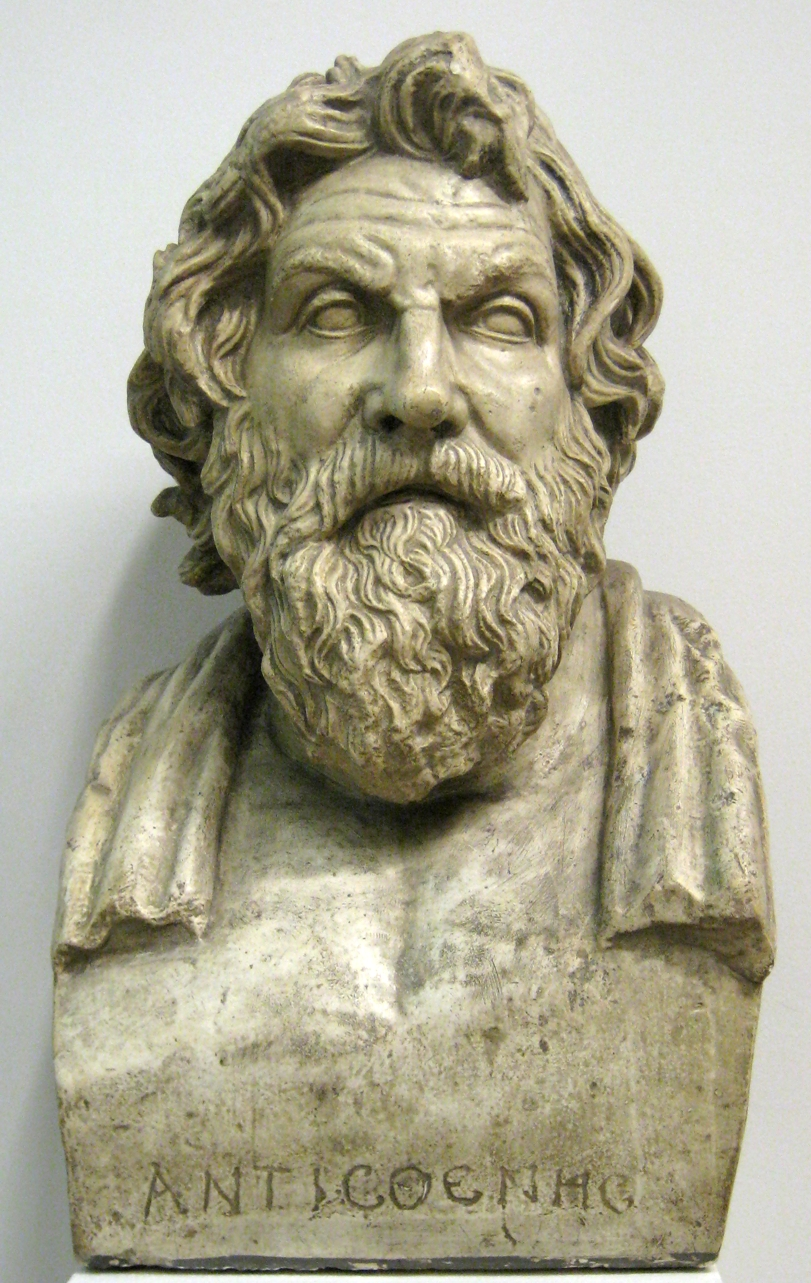
Bust of Antisthenes

The classical Greek and Roman Cynics regarded virtue as the only necessity for happiness, and saw virtue as entirely sufficient for attaining it. Classical Cynics followed this philosophy to the extent of neglecting everything not furthering their perfection of virtue and attainment of happiness, thus, the title of Cynic, derived from the Greek word κύων (meaning "dog") because they allegedly neglected society, hygiene, family, money, etc., in a manner reminiscent of dogs. They sought to free themselves from conventions; become self-sufficient; and live only in accordance with nature. They rejected any conventional notions of happiness involving money, power, and fame, to lead entirely virtuous, and thus happy, lives.

The ancient Cynics rejected conventional social values, and would criticise the types of behaviours, such as greed, which they viewed as causing suffering. Emphasis on this aspect of their teachings led, in the late 18th and early 19th centuries, to the modern understanding of cynicism as "an attitude of scornful or jaded negativity, especially a general distrust of the integrity or professed motives of others." This modern definition of cynicism is in marked contrast to the ancient philosophy, which emphasized "virtue and moral freedom in liberation from desire."

=== Influences ===
Various philosophers, such as the Pythagoreans, had advocated simple living in the centuries preceding the Cynics. In the early 6th century BC, Anacharsis, a Scythian sage, had combined plain living together with criticisms of Greek customs in a manner which would become standard among the Cynics. Perhaps of importance were tales of Indian philosophers, known as gymnosophists, who had adopted a strict asceticism. By the 5th century BC, the sophists had begun a process of questioning many aspects of Greek society such as religion, law and ethics. However, the most immediate influence for the Cynic school was Socrates. Although he was not an ascetic, he did profess a love of virtue and an indifference to wealth, together with a disdain for general opinion. These aspects of Socrates' thought, which formed only a minor part of Plato's philosophy, became the central inspiration for another of Socrates' pupils, Antisthenes.

=== Symbolisms ===
Cynics were often recognized in the ancient world by their apparel—an old cloak and a staff. The cloak was an allusion to Socrates and his manner of dress, the staff to the club of Heracles. These items became so symbolic of the Cynic vocation that ancient writers accosted those who thought that donning the Cynic garb would make them suited to the philosophy.

In the social evolution from the archaic age to the classical, the public ceased carrying weapons into the poleis. Originally it was expected that one carried a sword while in the city. However, a transition to spears and then to staffs occurred until wearing any weapon in the city became a foolish old custom. Thus, the very act of carrying a staff was slightly taboo itself. According to modern theorists, the symbol of the staff was one which both functions as a tool to signal the user's dissociation from physical labour, that is, as a display of conspicuous leisure, and at the same time it also has an association with sport and typically plays a part in hunting and sports clothing. Thus, it displays active and warlike qualities, rather than being a symbol of a weak man's need to support himself. The staff itself became a message of how the Cynic was free through its possible interpretation as an item of leisure, but, just as equivalent, was its message of strength—a virtue held in abundance by the Cynic philosopher.

=== Antisthenes ===
The story of Cynicism traditionally begins with Antisthenes (c. 445–365 BC), who was an older contemporary of Plato and a pupil of Socrates. About 25 years his junior, Antisthenes was one of the most important of Socrates' disciples. Although later classical authors had little doubt about labelling him as the founder of Cynicism, his philosophical views seem to be more complex than the later simplicities of pure Cynicism. In the list of works ascribed to Antisthenes by Diogenes Laërtius, writings on language, dialogue and literature far outnumber those on ethics or politics, although they may reflect how his philosophical interests changed with time. It is certainly true that Antisthenes preached a life of poverty:

I have enough to eat till my hunger is stayed, to drink till my thirst is sated; to clothe myself as well; and out of doors not [even] Callias there, with all his riches, is more safe than I from shivering; and when I find myself indoors, what warmer shirting do I need than my bare walls?

=== Diogenes of Sinope ===
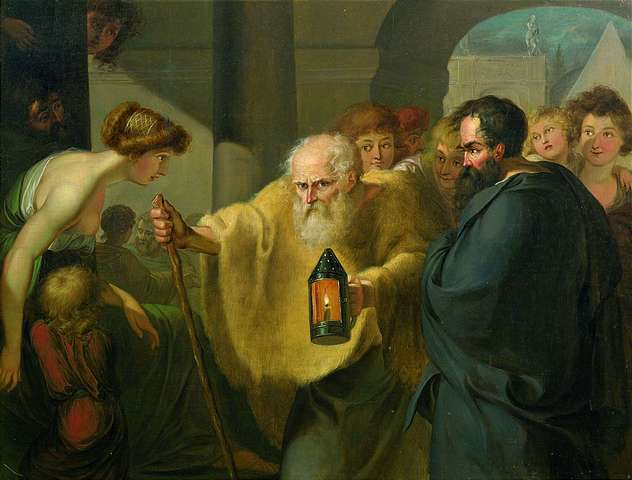
Diogenes Searching for an Honest Man (c. 1780) attributed to J. H. W. Tischbein

Diogenes (c. 412–323 BC) dominates the story of Cynicism like no other figure. He originally went to Athens, fleeing his home city, after he and his father, who was in charge of the mint at Sinope, got into trouble for falsifying the coinage. (The phrase "defacing the currency" later became proverbial in describing Diogenes' rejection of conventional values.) Later tradition claimed that Diogenes became the disciple of Antisthenes, but it is by no means certain that they ever met. Diogenes did however adopt Antisthenes' teachings and the ascetic way of life, pursuing a life of self-sufficiency (autarkeia), austerity (askēsis), and shamelessness (anaideia). There are many anecdotes about his extreme asceticism (sleeping in a tub), his shameless behaviour (eating raw meat), and his criticism of conventional society ("bad people obey their lusts as servants obey their masters"), and although it is impossible to tell which of these stories are true, they do illustrate the broad character of the man, including an ethical seriousness.

=== Crates of Thebes ===
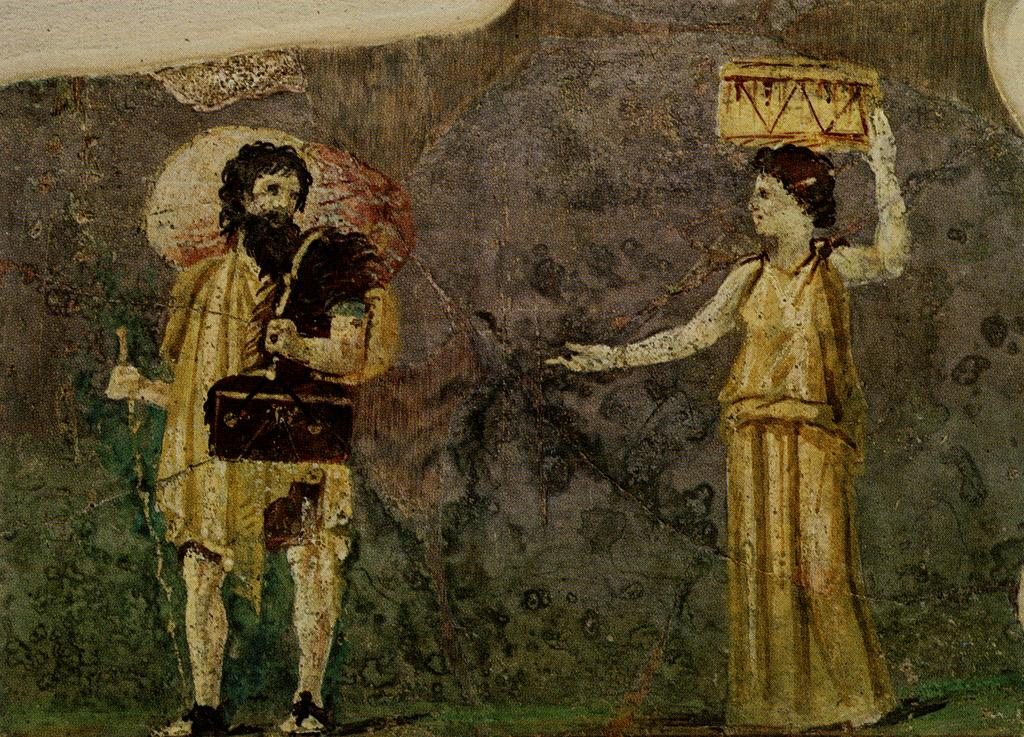
Crates and Hipparchia, an antique fresco from Rome

Crates of Thebes (c. 365 – c. 285 BC) is the third figure who dominates Cynic history. He is notable because he renounced a large fortune to live a life of Cynic poverty in Athens. He is said to have been a pupil of Diogenes, but again this is uncertain. Crates married Hipparchia of Maroneia after she had fallen in love with him and together they lived like beggars on the streets of Athens, where Crates was treated with respect. Crates' later fame (apart from his unconventional lifestyle) lies in the fact that he became the teacher of Zeno of Citium, the founder of Stoicism. The Cynic strain to be found in early Stoicism (such as Zeno's own radical views on sexual equality spelled out in his Republic) can be ascribed to Crates' influence.

=== Other Cynics ===
There were many other Cynics in the 4th and 3rd centuries BC, including Onesicritus (who sailed with Alexander the Great to India), the skeptic Monimus, the moral satirist Bion of Borysthenes, the legislator Cercidas of Megalopolis, the diatribist Teles and Menippus of Gadara. However, with the rise of Stoicism in the 3rd century BC, Cynicism as a serious philosophical activity underwent a decline, and it is not until the Roman era that Cynicism underwent a revival in the first century AD.

== Cynicism in the Roman world ==
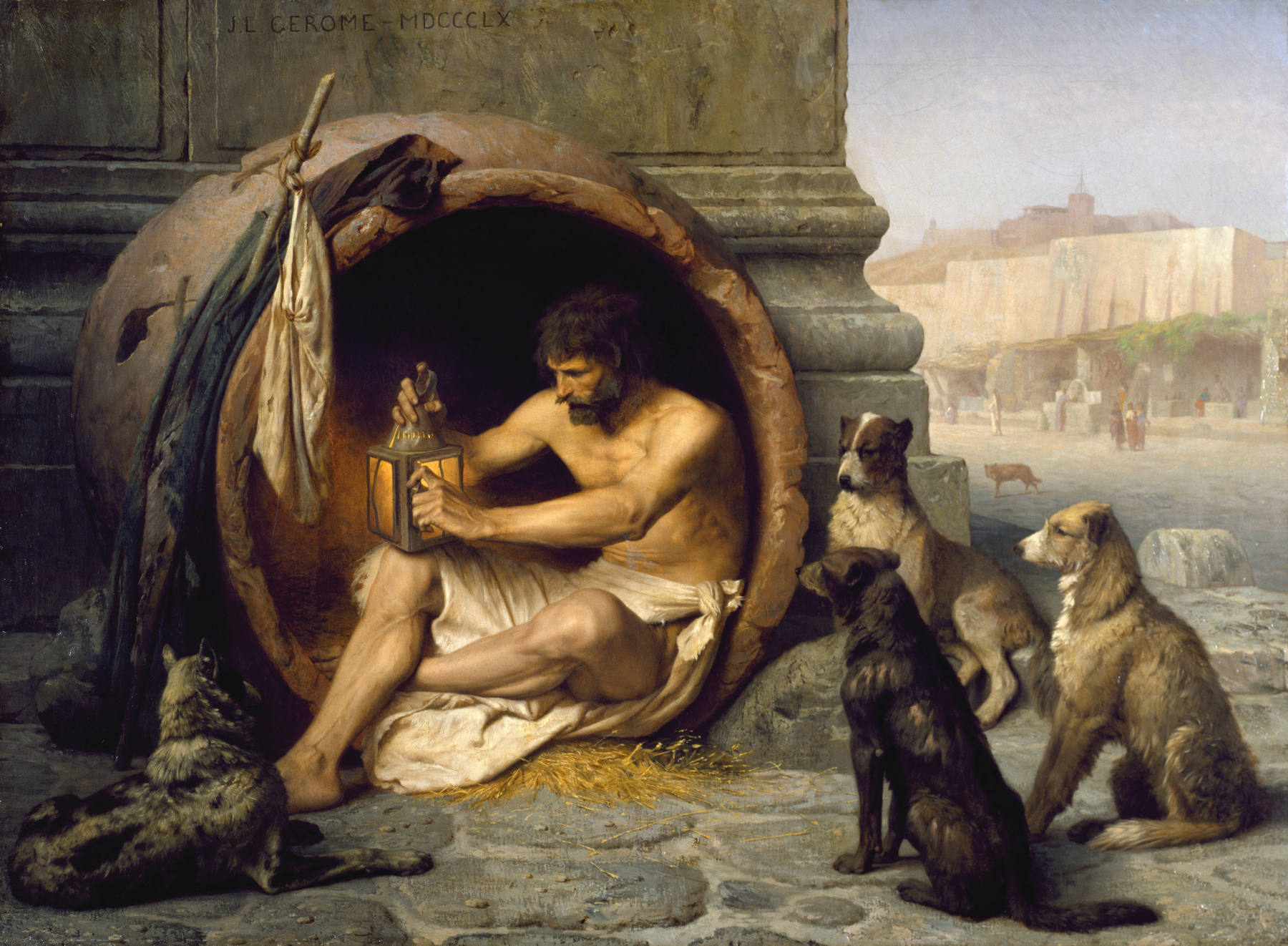
Diogenes Sitting in His Tub (1860) by Jean-Léon Gérôme

There is little record of Cynicism in the 2nd or 1st centuries BC; Cicero (c. 50 BC), who was much interested in Greek philosophy, had little to say about Cynicism, except that "it is to be shunned; for it is opposed to modesty, without which there can be neither right nor honor." However, by the 1st century CE, Cynicism reappeared with full force. The rise of Imperial Rome, like the Greek loss of independence under Philip II and Alexander three centuries earlier, may have led to a sense of powerlessness and frustration among many people, which allowed a philosophy which emphasized self-sufficiency and inner-happiness to flourish once again. Lucian complained that Cynics could be found throughout the empire, standing on street corners, preaching about virtue, writing that "every city is filled with such upstarts, particularly with those who enter the names of Diogenes, Antisthenes, and Crates as their patrons and enlist in the Army of the Dog", and Aelius Aristides observed that "they frequent the doorways, talking more to the doorkeepers than to the masters, making up for their lowly condition by using impudence." The most notable representative of Cynicism in the 1st century CE was Demetrius, whom Seneca praised as "a man of consummate wisdom, though he himself denied it, constant to the principles which he professed, of an eloquence worthy to deal with the mightiest subjects." Cynicism in Rome was both the butt of the satirist and the ideal of the thinker. In the 2nd century CE, Lucian, whilst pouring scorn on the Cynic philosopher Peregrinus Proteus, nevertheless praised his own Cynic teacher, Demonax, in a dialogue.

Cynicism came to be seen as an idealised form of Stoicism, a view which led Epictetus to eulogise the ideal Cynic in a lengthy discourse. According to Epictetus, the ideal Cynic "must know that he is sent as a messenger from Zeus to people concerning good and bad things, to show them that they have wandered." Unfortunately for Epictetus, many Cynics of the era did not live up to the ideal: "consider the present Cynics who are dogs that wait at tables, and in no respect imitate the Cynics of old except perchance in breaking wind."

Unlike Stoicism, which declined as an independent philosophy after the 2nd century CE, Cynicism seems to have thrived into the 4th century. The emperor Julian (ruled 361–363), like Epictetus, praised the ideal Cynic and complained about the actual practitioners of Cynicism. The final Cynic noted in classical history is Sallustius of Emesa in the late 5th century. A student of the Neoplatonic philosopher Isidore of Alexandria, he devoted himself to living a life of Cynic asceticism.

== Cynicism and Christianity ==
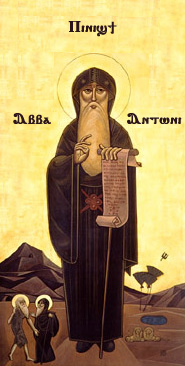
Coptic icon of Saint Anthony of the Desert, an early Christian ascetic. Early Christian asceticism may have been influenced by Cynicism.

=== Jesus as a Cynic ===
Some historians have noted the similarities between the teachings of Jesus and those of the Cynics. Some scholars have argued that the Q document, a hypothetical common source for the gospels of Matthew and Luke, has strong similarities to the teachings of the Cynics. Scholars on the quest for the historical Jesus, such as Burton L. Mack and John Dominic Crossan of the Jesus Seminar, have argued that 1st-century AD Galilee was a world in which Hellenistic ideas collided with Jewish thought and traditions. The city of Gadara, only a day's walk from Nazareth, was particularly notable as a centre of Cynic philosophy, and Mack has described Jesus as a "rather normal Cynic-type figure." For Crossan, Jesus was more like a Cynic sage from a Hellenistic Jewish tradition than either a Christ who would die as a substitute for sinners or a messiah who wanted to establish an independent Jewish state of Israel. Other scholars doubt that Jesus was deeply influenced by the Cynics and see the Jewish prophetic tradition as of much greater importance.

=== Cynic influences on early Christianity ===
Many of the ascetic practices of Cynicism may have been adopted by early Christians, and Christians often employed the same rhetorical methods as the Cynics. Some Cynics were martyred for speaking out against the authorities. One Cynic, Peregrinus Proteus, lived for a time as a Christian before converting to Cynicism, whereas in the 4th century, Maximus of Alexandria, although a Christian, was also called a Cynic because of his ascetic lifestyle. Christian writers would often praise Cynic poverty, although they scorned Cynic shamelessness, Augustine stating that they had, "in violation of the modest instincts of men, boastfully proclaimed their unclean and shameless opinion, worthy indeed of dogs." The ascetic orders of Christianity (such as the Desert Fathers) also had direct connection with the Cynics, as can be seen in the wandering mendicant monks of the early church, who in outward appearance and in many of their practices differed little from the Cynics of an earlier age. Emmanuel College scholar Leif E. Vaage compared the commonalities between the Q document and Cynic texts, such as the Cynic epistles. The epistles contain the wisdom and (often polemical) ethics preached by Cynics along with their sense of purity and ascetic practices.

During the 2nd century, Justin Martyr clashed with Crescens the Cynic, who is recorded as claiming the Christians were atheotatous ("the most godless"), in reference to their rejection of the pagan gods and their absence of temples, statues, or sacrifices. This was a popular criticism of the Christians and it continued on into the 4th century.

== See also ==
- Anticonformism
- Asceticism
- Cynic epistles
- Encratites
- Foolishness for Christ
- List of ancient Greek philosophers
- List of Cynic philosophers
- Natural law
- Stoicism
- Kotzker Rebbe (a chasidic "Cynic" in the ancient sense of the word)
