= Georg Anton Friedrich Ast =

German philosopher and philologist (1778–1841)

Sophokles: Trauerspiele translated by Friedrich Ast

Georg Anton Friedrich Ast (/ɑːst/; German: [ast]; 29 December 1778 – 31 December 1841) was a German philosopher and philologist.

== Biography ==
Ast was born in Gotha. Educated at the University of Jena, he became a privatdozent at Jena in 1802. In 1805, he became professor of classical literature at the Ludwig-Maximilians-Universität in Landshut, where he remained until 1826, when the university was transferred to Munich, now named Ludwig-Maximilians-Universität München. He lived in Munich until his death in 1841.

In recognition of his work, the Bavarian Academy of Sciences made him a member and aulic councillor. He is known principally for his work during the last twenty-five years of his life on the dialogues of Plato. His Plato's Leben and Schriften (1816)—which originated in the Introductions of Friedrich Schleiermacher and the historical scepticism of Niebuhr and Wolf—was the first of those critical inquiries into the life and works of Plato.

Distrusting tradition, he took a few of the finest dialogues as his standard, and from internal evidence denounced as spurious not only those generally admitted to be so (Epinomis, Minos, Theages, Rivales, Clitophon, Hipparchus, Eryxias, Letters and Definitions), but also the Meno, Euthydemus, Charmides, Lysis, Laches, First and Second Alcibiades, Hippias Major and Minor, Ion, Euthyphro, Apology, Crito, and even (against Aristotle's explicit assertion) The Laws. The genuine dialogues he divides into three series:

1. the earliest, marked chiefly by the poetical and dramatic element, i.e. Protagoras, Phaedrus, Gorgias, Phaedo;
2. the second, marked by dialectic subtlety, i.e. Theaetetus, Sophist, Statesman, Parmenides, Cratylus; and
3. the third group, combining both qualities harmoniously, i.e., the Philebus, Symposium, Republic, Timaeus, Critias.

The work was followed by a complete edition of Plato's works (2 vols., 1819–1832) with a Latin translation and commentary. His last work was the Lexicon Platonicum (3 vols., 1834–1839), which is both valuable and comprehensive. In his works on aesthetics he combined the views of Schelling with those of Winckelmann, Lessing, Kant, Herder, Schiller and others. His histories of philosophy are marked more by critical scholarship than by originality of thought, though they are interesting as asserting the now familiar principle that the history of philosophy is not the history of opinions, but of reason as a whole; he was among the first to attempt to formulate a principle of the development of thought.

Beside his works on Plato, he wrote, on aesthetics, System der Kunstlehre (1805) and Grundriß der Aesthetik (1807); on the history of philosophy, Grundlinien der Philosophie (1807, republished 1809, but soon forgotten), Grundriß einer Geschichte der Philosophie (1807 and 1825), and Hauptmomente der Geschichte der Philosophie (1829); in philology, Grundlinien der Philologie (1808), and Grundlinien der Grammatik, Hermeneutik und Kritik (1808).

Ast's ideas influenced Schleiermacher, the founder of hermeneutics.

== See also ==
- Hermeneutic circle, a notable idea put forward by Ast
