= Minos (dialogue) =

Dialogue attributed to Plato

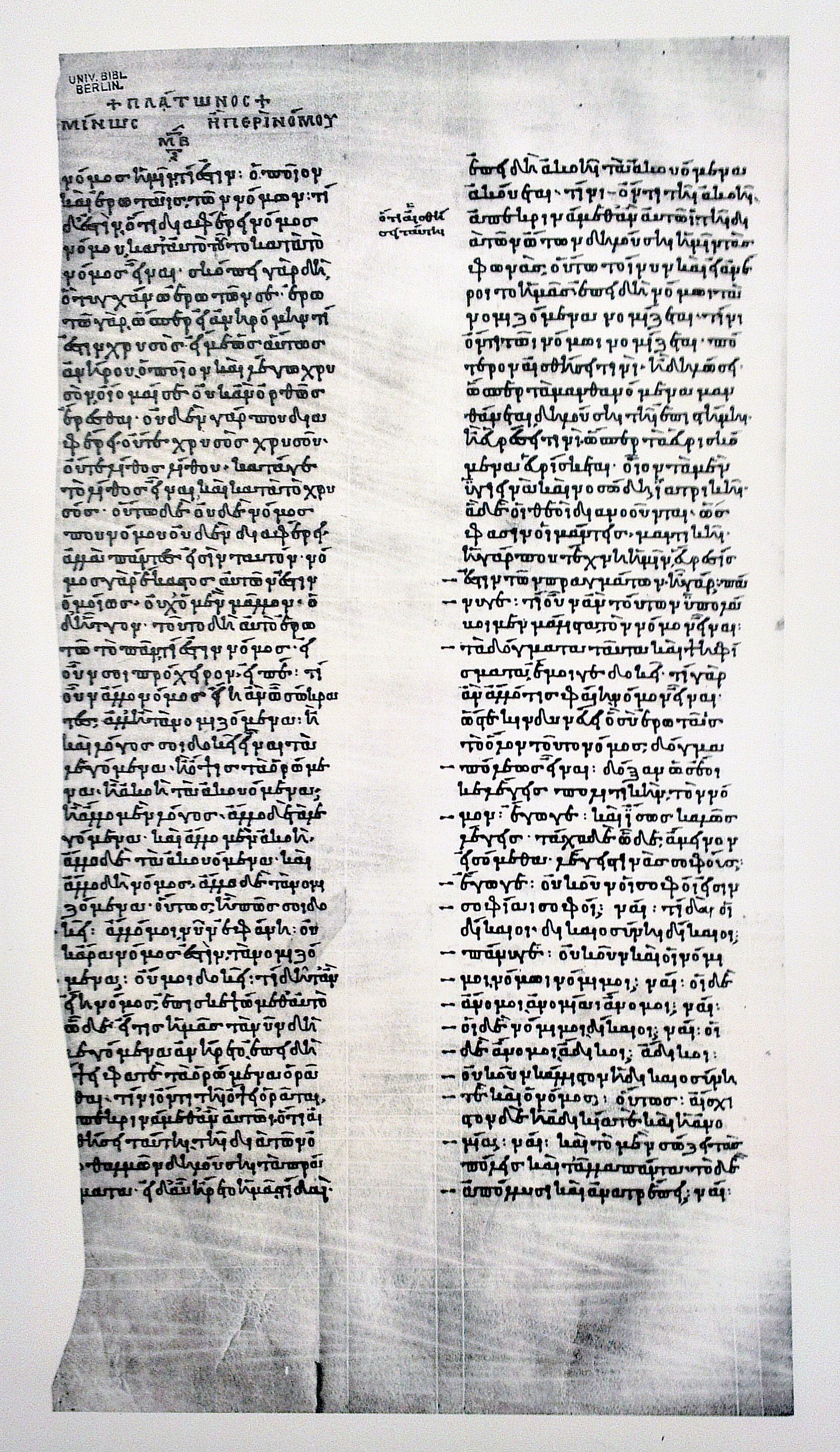
- Manuscript: Paris, Bibliothèque Nationale, Gr. 1807 (19th century)
- Author: Plato or Pseudo-Plato
- Original title: Μίνως
- Language: Greek
- Subject: Philosophy of law
- Publication place: Ancient Greece

Minos (/ˈmaɪnɒs, -nəs/; Greek: Μίνως) is purported to be one of the dialogues of Plato. It features Socrates and a companion who together attempt to find a definition of "law" (Greek: νόμος, nómos).

Despite its authenticity having been doubted by many scholars, it has often been regarded as a foundational document in the history of legal philosophy, particularly in the theory of natural law. It has also conversely been interpreted as describing a largely procedural theory of law. Ancient commentators have traditionally considered the work as a preamble to Plato's final dialogue, Laws.

== Content ==
The dialogue is normally separated into two sections. In the first half, Socrates and a companion attempt to seek a definition of "law," while in the second half Socrates praises Minos, the mythical king of Crete.

=== Definition of law ===
The dialogue opens with Socrates asking his nameless companion, "What is law for us?" The companion asks from Socrates to clarify which law he means exactly to which Socrates, somewhat surprised, asks from him whether the law is one or many. More specifically, Socrates asks his companion whether different laws are like parts of gold, with each part being from the same essence as the other, or like stones, with each being separate. The companion's answer is that law is nomizomena (νομιζόμενα) or "the things that are accepted by custom". The Greek word for law is nomos, which is also used to describe an established custom or practice. The companion defines nomos as something nomizomenon (the present passive participle of the related verb nomizō), meaning "accepted." Nomizō is used to mean "practice," "have in common or customary use," "enact," "treat," "consider as" and "belief," amongst other things. Socrates opposes this definition:

Companion: What else would law (nomos) be, Socrates, but the things that are accepted (nomizomena)?

Socrates: And so speech, in your view, is the things that are said, or sight the things that are seen, or hearing the things that are heard? Or is speech one thing, the things that are spoken another, sight one thing, the things that are seen another, hearing one thing, and the things that are heard another—and so law one thing, the things that are accepted another? Is that so, or what is your view?

Companion: They are two different things, as it now seems to me.

Socrates: Law, then, is not the things that are accepted

Companion: I think not.

Just like what we call "hearing" is not the sum of things heard but a sensation, a proper definition of law needs to capture an essence apart from the customary opinions that embody the law at any given moment. Supposing that laws are resolutions of a city, Socrates argues back saying that if we should consider law and justice to always be kaliston (κάλλιστον), "something most noble", while agreeing that a city's resolution can be either "admirable" or "wicked," it follows that identifying the law with these resolutions is incorrect. Instead, Socrates proceeds by asking what is good opinion.

Socrates: But what is a good opinion? Is it not a true opinion?

Companion: Yes.

Socrates: Now isn't true opinion, discovery of reality?

Companion: It is.

Socrates: Then ideally law is discovery of reality.

Socrates goes on to defend his definition of law as "that which wants to discover reality". His companion objects that if that was true then law would be same everywhere, but we know that it isn't, and he gives the example of human sacrifice which is forbidden in Crete where the dialogue takes place, while the Carthaginians and some Greek cities will practice it. Socrates proceeds to counter this argument using his famous method, asking from his companion to give short answers like he did in the Protagoras dialogue. He shows that since law is based on knowing reality, it cannot be different even if it appears to be. Just like the farmer is best at knowing the realities of the land, and the trainer of the human body, so is a king best in knowing the realities of human soul upon which laws should take effect. This is how the dialogue segues into praising Minos, the best, according to Socrates, of kings that have existed.

=== Praise of Minos ===
The dialogue eventually proceeds into praise of Minos, the mythical leader of Crete and an ancient enemy of Athens. Socrates counters his companion's opinion that Minos was unjust, saying that his idea is based on theater plays, but once they consult Homer and Hesiod, who are superior to all tragic playwrights put together, they shall find that Minos is worthy of praise. He continues by saying that Minos was the only man to be educated by Zeus himself, and created admirable laws for the Cretans, who are unique in avoiding excessive drinking, later teaching their practice to the Spartans. Minos instructed Rhadamanthus in parts of his "kingly art", enough for him to guard his laws. Zeus then gave Minos a man called Talos, that while thought to have been a giant robot-like automaton made of bronze, Socrates insists that his nickname of "brazen" was due to him holding bronze tablets where Minos' laws were inscribed.

After this encomium, Socrates' companion asks how is it, if everything that he had just heard was true, that Minos has such a bad reputation in Athens. Socrates responds by saying that this was the result of Minos attacking Athens while the city had good poets who, through their art, can harm a person greatly.

== Interpretation ==
Bradley Lewis conceives of the Minos as doing three things: it begins by showing that the ultimate aspiration of law should be truth, while also acknowledging the variety of human laws. This diversity is often taken as an argument against natural law, but the dialogue suggests that the diversity is compatible with the account of the human good being the end of politics. Next, the dialogue underscores the origins of law and legal authority as concrete. Thirdly, the dialogue suggests, but does not explicitly mention, the inherent limitations of contemporary theories of law.

Though the dialogue is often noted as introducing a theory of natural law, the word "nature" (Greek: φύσις phusis) is never used in the dialogue. Mark Lutz argues that Socrates's account of the problematic character of law shows that the concept of natural law is incoherent.

The unnamed interlocutor (Greek: ἑταῖρος hetairos) can be translated in several different ways. Outside of the dialogue, the word is typically translated as "companion," "comrade," "pupil," or "disciple." In the context of Minos however, other conceptions of the interlocutor have been suggested, including being an ordinary citizen, a student, a friend, an "Everyman" and the "voice of common sense."

D.S. Hutchinson has pointed out that the combination of "dry academic dialectic together with a literary-historical excursus" is similar to that of other Platonic dialogues, such as the Atlantis myth in Timaeus and Critias, as well other cases in Alcibiades, Second Alcibiades and Hipparchus.

In the dialogue, bodies of laws are conceived as written texts that can be either true of false. In Plato's later dialogue, Laws, he similarly held that legal texts benefit from literary elaboration. A proper law is expected to express the reality of social life, which endures just as the ideal city described in Laws would.

The culminating praise of Minos has been interpreted as part of Socrates' intention to liberate the companion from loyalty to Athens and its opinions.

== Authenticity ==
The majority of modern scholars oppose Platonic authorship, including Werner Jaeger, Anton-Hermann Chroust, Jerome Hall, A. E. Taylor and most recently Christopher Rowe. Conversely, there have been cases made arguing in favor of Plato's authorship, including from George Grote, Glenn R. Morrow and William S. Cobb. Paul Shorey suggested that the dialogue may have been partly written by Plato and partly by someone else.

The main arguments against the authenticity of Minos typically say that it is too stylistically crude, philosophically simplistic and too full of poor argumentation to legitimately be Plato. Grote pointed out a flaw in this reasoning, noting that if the dialogue being "confused and unsound" and "illogical" were grounds to exclude it from the Platonic corpus, then one would also have to cast doubt on the Phaedo since Plato's arguments in it for the immortality of the soul are so ineffective.

W. R. M. Lamb doubts the authenticity of the dialogue because of its unsatisfying character, though he does consider it a "fairly able and plausible imitation of Plato's early work." Edith Hamilton and Huntington Cairns do not even include it among Plato's spurious works in their Collected Dialogues. Leo Strauss, on the other hand, considered the dialogue to be authentic enough to write a commentary on it.

The tension between the first half, which extols law as the "discovery of reality," followed by the praising of the mythical figure Minos, who is typically described in tradition as a brutal despot, has been viewed by some as reason to doubt the dialogue. This apparent incoherence between the two parts of the dialogue has been utilized as one argument against Platonic authorship, though others have seen the introduction of Minos as being perfectly coherent.

=== Placement in the Platonic Corpus ===
Many historical commentators have viewed the Minos as a kind of introduction to the Laws. Aristophanes of Byzantium placed the Minos with the Laws in his organization of Plato's writings as trilogies and tetralogies, (Note: Aristophanes placed Minos in the third of five collections for the trilogy organization, and in the ninth and final collection for the tetralogy organization.) as did Thrasyllus in his later tetralogical organization of the Platonic corpus: (Note: Thrasyllus placed Minos in the ninth and final collection in his tetralogy organization.)

Placement	Aristophanes's trilogy organization	Aristophanes's tetralogy organization	Thrasyllus's tetralogy organization
1	Laws	Minos	Minos
2	Minos	Laws	Laws
3	Epinomis	Epinomis	Epinomis
4	–	Letters	Letters

Because of the similarities in style to the Hipparchus, many scholars have concluded that they are the work of the same author, written soon after the middle of the fourth century B.C. Böckh ascribed the dialogue to a minor Socratic, Simon the Shoemaker, who is mentioned by Diogenes Laërtius as a note-taker of Socrates.
