= Philip of Opus =

Ancient Greek scholar

Philip (or Philippus) of Opus (Greek: Φίλιππος Ὀπούντιος, fl. 4th century BC) was a philosopher, astronomer, and mathematician. He was a member of Plato's Academy and after the master's death, edited his last work, Laws. He is generally considered the author of the Platonic Epinomis (On the Laws), a follow-on conversation among the same interlocutors.

== Ancient evidence for Philip ==
Not much is known about Philip other than that given above. He received several mentions in the centuries after his death, but other than acknowledging his fame, little beyond the above information was provided. The most important references are those by Diogenes Laërtius, who wrote short biographies of many early philosophers, and the 10th century CE Souda, a catalog of several thousand persons and terms from antiquity.

In his biography of Plato, Diogenes wrote:

Some say that Philip the Opuntian transcribed his work, Laws, which was written in wax [wooden tablets coated with wax]. They also say that Epinomis is his.

And in another passage, Philip is listed among the members of the Academy:

His [Plato's] disciples were Speusippus of Athens, Xenocrates of Chalcedon, Aristotle of Stagira, Philippus of Opus...

In the Souda, Philip is listed anonymously under the heading of philosophos ("philosopher"), his name being lost from the beginning of the entry:

Philosopher who divided the Laws of Plato into 12 books; for he himself is said to have added the 13th. And he was a pupil of Socrates and of Plato himself, occupied with the study of the heavens. Living in the time of Philip of Macedon, he wrote the following: On the distance of the sun and moon; On gods (2); On time (1); On myths (1); On freedom (1); On anger (1); On reciprocation (1); On the Opuntian Lokrians; On pleasure (1); On passion (1); On friends and friendship (1); On writing; On Plato; On eclipse[s] of the moon; On the size of the sun and moon and earth (1); On lightning; On the planets; Arithmetic; On prolific numbers; Optics (2); Enoptics (2); Kykliaka; Means; etc.

Since the entry is placed under the heading Philosophos, the man's name presumably was missing in the source used by the author of the Souda. It was not until the early 18th century that Ludolf Küster, who edited the Souda, identified this anonymous entry with the Philip of Opus mentioned by Diogenes Laërtius. In a footnote to it, he wrote:

I have long inquired who this anonymous philosopher is, of whom Souda speaks here. At last I found that he was Philip Opuntius, a disciple of Plato; and this information comes from Laërtius in the life of Plato, number 37. For there you read, that Philip Opuntius was the author of the Epinomis, which is book xiii. Moreover, reviewing the writings of our anonymous philosopher, we see, among other things, that he wrote about Locris Opuntius, it is testified that no one laughs at how well Philippus Opuntius fits.

Philip's name appears in the works of several other ancient writers. In chronological order, they are: Vitruvius (Marcus Vitruvius Pollio), in de Architectura (1st century BCE):

In respect of natural philosophy Thales the Milesian, Anaxagoras of Clazomenæ, Pythagoras the Samian, Xenophanes of Colophon, Democritus the Abderite, have published systems which explain the mode in which Nature is regulated, and how every effect is produced. Eudoxus, Endæmon, Callippus, Melo, Philip, Hipparchus, Aratus, and others, following in the steps of the preceding, found, by the use of instruments, the rising and setting of the stars and the changes of the seasons, and left treatises thereon for the use of posterity. Their learning will be admired by mankind, because, added to the above, they appear as if by divine inspiration to have foretold the weather at particular seasons of the year. For a knowledge of these matters reference must therefore be made to their labours and investigation.

Pliny the Elder, in Natural History (1st Century CE):

It is a remarkable fact, and rarely the case, that Philippus, Callippus, Dositheus, Parmeniscus, Conon, Criton, Democritus, and Eudoxus, all agree that the She-Goat rises in the morning of the fourth before the calends of October, and on the third the Kids.

Pseudo-Plutarch, in Moralia (2nd Century CE):

... what and how great satisfactions may we then suppose to have been reaped from geometry and astronomy by Euclid when he wrote his Dioptrics, by Philippus when he had perfected his demonstration of the shape [schema] of the moon ... [i.e., explained the phases]

Proclus, in his Commentary on Euclid's Elements (5th century CE):

Philippus of Mende, a disciple of Plato and induced by him to study mathematics, conducted researches at Plato's suggestions, and set himself the task of giving completeness to Plato's philosophy.

Stephanus of Byzantium (6th Century CE):

Medme: a city in Italy, and a spring of the same name, Hecate, Europe, from a certain spring from Medme. A citizen of Medme, Philip, was a man worthy of mention, who wrote about the winds.

== How many Philips? ==
That these authors named three different home cities for Philip has caused confusion among scholars. Opuntian Locris was northwest of Athens about 80 miles. Mende was a colony of Eretria (Euboia) on the Pallene Peninsula in northern Greece. Medme was a colony of the Locrians on the western coast of southern Italy. Could there really have been three different astronomer/mathematicians named Philip from such far-flung places studying with Plato? Or are we faced with a series of copying errors or other mistakes propagated down the centuries?

Regardless of his origin, it appears that Philip, through his association with the Academy and the fact that his writing survived for some centuries, was among the more eminent natural philosophers of the time.

== Authorship of Epinomis ==
Not all scholars – ancient or modern – have accepted Philip's authorship of Epinomis. Thrasyllus, the 1st century CE grammarian and astrologer who organized Plato's works into nine tetralogies, included it in the last along with Minos, Laws, and the thirteen epistles. Modern scholars who have made a case for Plato's authorship include A. E. Taylor and H. Raeder, who, according to Werner Jaeger, “wanted to credit him with the mathematical knowledge it contains”. Most, however, going along with Diogenes and Küster's interpretation of the Souda, accept Philip's authorship. The question then becomes how to evaluate it. Is it "spurious", "fraudulent", the ramblings of a Platonic imitator? Or is it an authorized complement to a work that Plato himself did not live to complete? Jaeger leans toward the latter view:

After Plato died, Philip of Opus, who was his secretary and his Boswell, edited The Laws from his incomplete draft on wax tablets, and divided it into twelve books. He noticed the gap created by the absence of any system for educating the ruler, and tried to compensate it by defining in greater detail the special wisdom which the ruler ought to possess. These supplementary ideas he recorded in the treatise which still exists as the Epinomis or Appendix to the Laws at the end of the book itself. The Academy must have entrusted him with this task because he knew the manuscripts Plato had left and the plans he had had in mind, so that we cannot call the Epinomis a forgery. It is rather a supplement to The Laws, which Plato's own school therefore considered to be incomplete.

And again:

Plato's pupil Philip, who edited the Laws, is certainly echoing his master's thoughts when he says in the Epinomis that mathematical astronomy, the knowledge of the 'visible gods', is an image of the supreme wisdom manifested in them.
