= Epinomis =

Dialogue written by Plato of Athens

Epinomis (Greek: Ἐπινομίς, or On the Laws) is the final dialogue in the Platonic corpus, a follow-on conversation among the interlocutors of Laws – a twelve-book exploration of the best way to structure a polis. The participants in the conversation were Clinias of Crete, Megillus of Sparta, and an unnamed Athenian. In Epinomis they reconvene to address an issue not covered in the earlier discussion: how one acquires wisdom.

== Synopsis ==
Cleinias has reconvened with Megillus and the Athenian and poses the question, “What are the studies which will lead a mortal man to wisdom (σοφια)?” (973b). In answer, the Athenian begins by saying that “bliss and felicity” are impossible for most people because life for both young and old is too full of pain and discomfort, and so they have little time to devote to learning. The brief span of middle age, when these discomforts abate for a while, is insufficient – only a few are able to make the effort. Beyond that, most who do seek wisdom look for it in the arts and sciences that are necessary for living: husbandry and manufacture, divination, music and drawing, and even the defensive sciences of war and medicine – but none of these are of much help. “None of their devices can bestow reputation for the truest wisdom; they are at sea on an ocean of fanciful conjecture, without reduction to rule” (975a). The one science that can lead us to wisdom is the science of number (αριθμος) (976e) – which is a gift from a god. Which god? Uranus, or call him Chronos or Olympus, as you please. “And with the gift of the whole number series, so we shall assume, he gives us likewise the rest of understanding and all other good things. But this is the greatest boon of all, that a man will accept his gift of number and let his mind expatiate over the whole heavenly circuit” (977b). The other virtues – justice, courage, and temperance – are attainable without this knowledge, but true wisdom requires it.

The discussion then shifted to cosmology, with the goal of demonstrating that a proper understanding of creation is a prerequisite to achieving wisdom. The Athenian first disparaged the accounts of Hesiod and others about the generation of gods and humanity. Referring back to the discussion of religion in Laws, he recalled his assertions there that the gods exist, that they care about all things great or small, and that no entreaties can deflect them from the path of justice. He now added that it must be true that the soul is older than the body – the point being that all the existent “bodies” that we see, whether on earth or in the heavens, are animated by incorporeal “soul”. It is soul that forms the raw elements – of which there are five (earth, air, fire, water, and aether) – into living bodies. While all bodies are composed of all elements, one element dominates in the different kinds. For all living creatures on earth, this is “earth”. For those in the sky, fire.

Furthermore, the heavenly bodies – sun, moon, stars, and the five planets – Hermes (Mercury), Aphrodite (Venus), Ares (Mars), Zeus (Jupiter), and Chronos (Saturn) – are intelligent, while those on earth are not. How so? How else could the celestial bodies keep their regular motions eternally without it? Only by being animated by gods could they maintain their orbits. The lack of regularity in the motions of bodies on earth, both human and non-human, is a sign of their lack of intelligence.

In between the sky and the earth is a mid region, populated by other sorts of beings: daemons and the like, composed primarily of aether or air, transparent and undiscerned, but who can read our thoughts. They regard the good with favor and the evil with aversion. They can feel pain and pleasure, unlike the gods, who are beyond such things, and they act as interpreters of all things, to each other and to the gods. And the fifth element, water, belongs to what we would call a demigod “that is sometimes to be seen, but anon conceals itself and becomes invisible, and thus perplexes us by its indistinct appearance” (985b). That these daemons, demigods and the like sometimes appear in dreams or come to us in oracular or prophetic voices heard by the sick or dying has led to a raft of religious practices that do not focus on the true gods – and isn’t it craven that those who know the truth do not speak up?

Here the Athenian reviewed his earlier points about the celestial bodies and the gods that inhabit/animate them, going on to celebrate the fact that Greeks enjoy a geographical setting that is “exceptionally favorable to the attainment of excellence”. Though they discovered the gods later than other societies, “whenever they borrow anything from non-Greeks, they finally carry it to a higher perfection” (987e). And in due fashion they will come to a better understanding of the nature those gods – and this brought him back to “number” – the true path to that understanding.

So what form of education is required to teach wisdom? We need to discover–

the form of education or science such that defective acquaintance with it leaves us ignorant of our just rights, so long as the deficiency subsists… I have sought the vision of it in the heights and in the depths and will now do my best to set it clearly before you. The source of the trouble, as I am strongly persuaded by our recent discussion, is that our practice in the very chief point of virtue is amiss. There is no human virtue – and we must never let ourselves be argued out of this belief – greater than piety (989a-b).

The knowledge required for wisdom comes from god, so reverence for the gods is the sine qua non of the path to it. But how do we learn piety?

The name we give to the study is one which will surprise a person unfamiliar with the subject – astronomy (ἀστρονομία) (990a).

And astronomy involves preliminary teaching in mathematics (μαθημάτων), geometry (γεωμετρίαν), solid geometry (stereometry, στερεομετρία), and the relationships found in music (harmony, ἁρμονία).

To the man who pursues his studies in the proper way, all geometric construction, all systems of numbers, all duly constituted melodic progressions, the single ordered scheme of all celestial revolutions, should disclose themselves, and disclose themselves they will, if, as I say, a man pursues his studies aright with his mind’s eye fixed on their single end. As such a man reflects, he will receive the revelation of a single bond of natural interconnection between all these problem. If such matters are handled in any other spirit, a man, as I am saying, will need to invoke his luck. We may rest assured that without these qualifications the happy will not make their appearance in any society; this is the method, this the pabulum, these the studies demanded; hard or easy, this is the road we must tread. And piety itself forbids us to disregard the gods, now that the glad news of them all has been duly revealed. (991e-992b)

The Athenian’s final comments turned the conversation back to the problem, not fully address in Laws, of who should rule.

And therefore we declare by our personal voices and enact it in our public law that those who have labored in these studies, when they reach advanced age at last, shall be invested with our chief magistries, that others shall follow their leading in reverence of speech toward all gods of either sex, and that we should do very right, now that we fully understand what this wisdom is and have put its claim to a proper test, to call upon all the members of our nocturnal council to take their part in it (992d).

To sum up, the Athenian’s argument is basically this: that of the four virtues (courage, justice, temperance, and wisdom) wisdom is the greatest – the knowledge of how to best apply the other benefits available to us. This can only be learned through piety (εὐσεβείας): reverence for and knowledge of the gods – not the gods as some have described them (Hesiod and others), but in their true nature. That nature is revealed in their visible expression: the motions of the eight bodies in the heavens: sun, stars, moon and planets. These bodies move not through ignorance, but because of the divine intelligence animating them. Ignorance – the state of things on the earth – results in chaotic motion, flitting here and there. Only intelligence can keep a body moving according to its original purpose. The science required for understanding the divinity observable in the sky is astronomy and its necessary components: mathematics, geometry, solid geometry, and music. And this is the path to wisdom.

In Epinomis the inchoate mysticism of Plato’s earlier dialogs now had a focus. Whether Plato himself had reached this understanding, or it came about through the work of his students is not clear. Understanding this intellectual progression is made difficult by the question, both ancient and modern, of who actually wrote Epinomis.

== Authorship / Authenticity ==
The authorship of Epinomis has been in dispute since ancient times. The grammarian Thrasyllus (1st century CE), as reported by Diogenes Laërtius (3rd century CE) in his biographical sketch of Plato, included it in the last of his nine Platonic tetralogies, along with Minos, Laws, and the Epistles. Diogenes, however, also reported that:

Some say that Philip the Opuntian transcribed his work, Laws, which was written in wax. They also say that Epinomis is his.

This attribution was repeated by the author of the 10th century CE Souda:

[Unnamed] Philosopher who divided the Laws of Plato into 12 books; for he himself is said to have added the 13th. And he was a pupil of Socrates and of Plato himself, occupied with the study of the heavens. Living in the time of Philip of Macedon, he wrote the following: On the distance of the sun and moon; On gods (2); On time (1); On myths (1); On freedom (1); On anger (1); On reciprocation (1); On the Opuntian Lokrians; On pleasure (1); On passion (1); On friends and friendship (1); On writing; On Plato; On eclipse[s] of the moon; On the size of the sun and moon and earth (1); On lightning; On the planets; Arithmetic; On prolific numbers; Optics (2); Enoptics (2); Kykliaka; Means; etc.

The identity of the Souda’s unnamed Philosopher was discovered by Ludolph Küster, who published an edition and translation of the work in 1705, clearly establishing that it was Philip. He explained his reasoning in this note:

I have long inquired who this anonymous philosopher is, of whom Souda speaks here. At last I found that he was Philip Opuntius, a disciple of Plato; and this information comes from Laërtius in the life of Plato, number 37. For there you read, that Philip Opuntius was the author of the Epinomis, which is book xiii. Moreover, reviewing the writings of our anonymous philosopher, we see, among other things, that he wrote about Locris Opuntius, it is testified that no one laughs at how well Philippus Opuntius fits.

Modern scholars are divided on the question of whether the author of Epinomis was Plato or Philip. A. E. Taylor and the German H. Raeder opted for Platonic authorship, in the words of Werner Jaeger, “because they wanted to credit him with the mathematical knowledge it contains”. Stylometric analysis linking Epinomis with Laws, such as that performed by Gerhard Ledger, would seem to support Platonic authorship, but as Debra Nails and Holger Thesleff point out, such analysis can lead to the opposite conclusion: that Laws itself was not written by Plato – that both works represent:

an accretion of material onto a Platonic stem, given its final appearance by someone whose heavily mannered style partly corresponds to a practice adopted in the so-called late dialogues, but who lacked a coherent view of the themes treated.

Most others accepted the ancient testimony crediting Philip of Opus with authorship. If one accepts this, the question then becomes whether Philip’s effort had official sanction from the leaders of the Academy, or he was writing “out of school”? Beyond that, was he reflecting Plato’s ideas as they had developed in his later years, or was he going beyond Plato and imbuing Epinomis with his own beliefs (as Nails and Thesleff allege)? These questions have also been extensively debated. Werner Jaeger, writing in the 1940s, saw Philip as working with the Academy’s blessing:

After Plato died, Philip of Opus, who was his secretary and his Boswell, edited The Laws from his incomplete draft on wax tablets, and divided it into twelve books. He noticed the gap created by the absence of any system for educating the ruler, and tried to compensate it by defining in greater detail the special wisdom which the ruler ought to possess. These supplementary ideas he recorded in the treatise which still exists as the Epinomis or Appendix to the Laws at the end of the book itself. The Academy must have entrusted him with this task because he knew the manuscripts Plato had left and the plans he had had in mind, so that we cannot call the Epinomis a forgery. It is rather a supplement to The Laws, which Plato’s own school therefore considered to be incomplete.

Leonardo Tarán, writing in the early 1970s, was less certain about Philip’s authorship, but accepted that the balance of evidence was in his favor. He was not, however, convinced that Philip had a firm grasp on the state of Plato’s thought at the time, maintaining (in the words of one reviewer) that it represented a:

misunderstanding or contradiction of Platonic doctrines, such as the placing of astronomy above dialectic as the supreme object of study, the rejection of the Ideas. the introduction of a fifth element, aether, between fire and air, and the elaborate theory of daemons inhabiting the three middle elements.

The question will no doubt continue to be debated. Any resolution will depend on knowing how Plato’s thought may have evolved in his later years. The Laws itself already represented a massive change from Republic, Plato’s earlier effort to define the best state. Instead of the “ideal” society of Republic, in Laws he was content to work out the details of the “best possible” state. The ideal forms were not mentioned in that work, and it would seem disingenuous to criticize Epinomis for not including them. As for adding “aether” to the standard list of four elements, Aristotle had already written about this in On Philosophy before he left the Academy, though the author of Epinomis put the five in a different order. Finally, the concept of “daemon” had been an integral part of the Socratic dialogs written decades earlier, so the most that can be said of it here is that our author did not invent the entity, merely gave it a specific place in his cosmology. It seems sure that the ideas reflected in Epinomis were at least in general discussion among Academy members at the time it was written. Whether Plato had incorporated these ideas into his own thinking is anyone’s guess.
