= Rival Lovers =

Socratic dialogue attributed to Plato

The Lovers (Ancient Greek: Ἐρασταί, romanized: Erastai; Latin: Amatores) is a Socratic dialogue included in the traditional corpus of Plato's works, though its authenticity has been doubted.

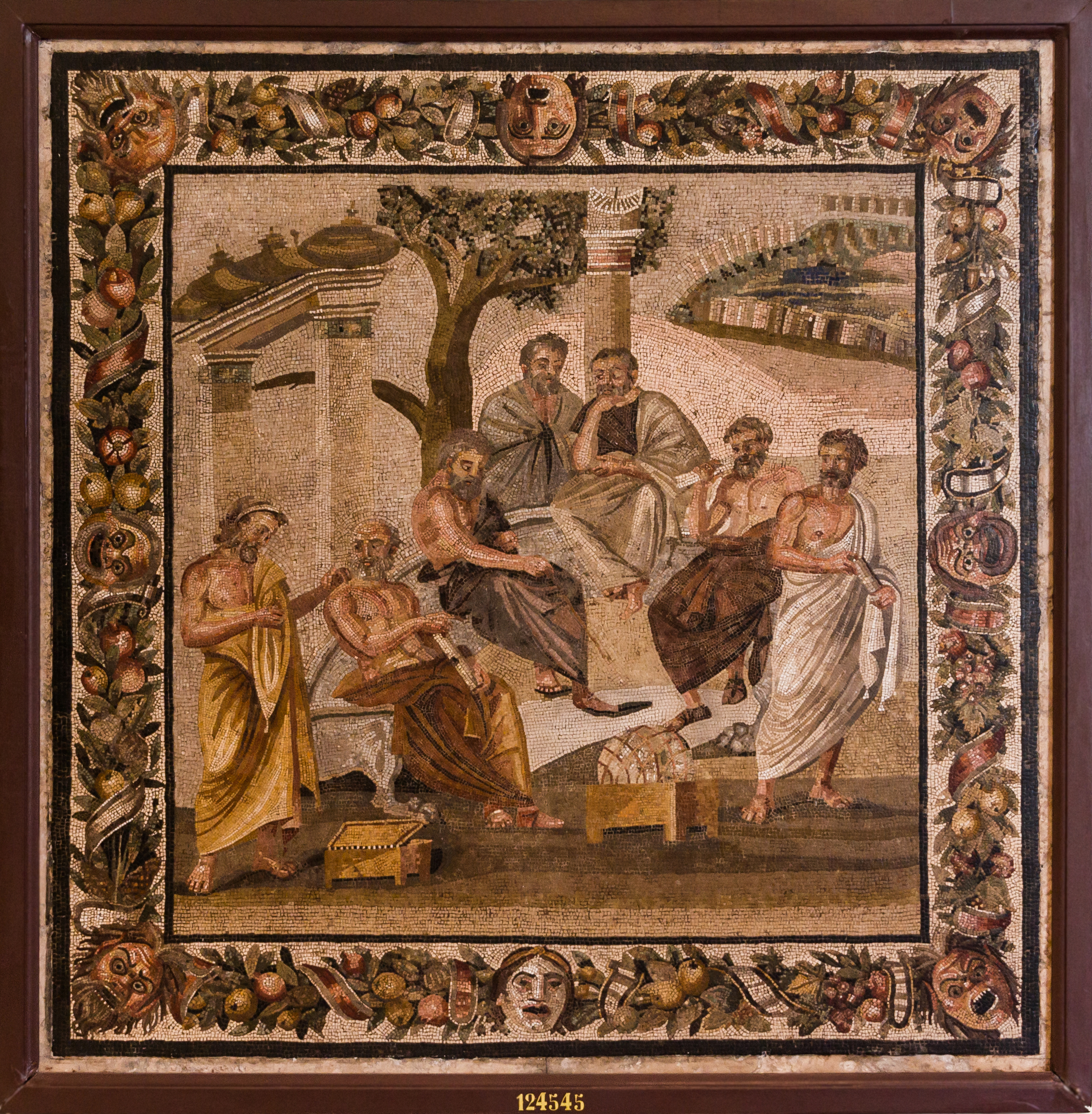
Lovers

== Title ==
The Greek title Erastai is the plural form of the term erastēs, which refers to the older partner in a pederastic relationship. Since in Classical Greek terms such a relationship consists of an erastēs and an erōmenos, the title Lovers, sometimes used for this dialogue, makes sense only if understood in the technical sense of "lover" versus "beloved" but is misleading if taken to refer to two people in a love relationship. Ancient manuscript marginalia suggest that the title might have been Anterastai (Ἀντερασταί), which specifically means "Rival erastai." This term, used in the dialogue itself (132c5, 133b3), is mentioned as the dialogue's title (together with a subtitle, On Philosophy) in Diogenes Laërtius' listing of the Thrasyllan tetralogies (3.59). The Latin translations Amatores and Rivales have also been used as the dialogue's title.

== Synopsis ==
The rival lovers (erastai) of the title are an athlete, and a young man devoted to the humanities, mousikē (music) in the original text, a term that in ancient times included music, poetry, and philosophy. The dialogue opens with Socrates entering a grammar school, as a couple of young boys were quarrelling about something related to learning. Socrates asks the person next to him, who happened to be one of the boys lover, to tell him whether their quarrel was about an important issue in philosophy. Judging by his reply, Socrates gets the impression that this man is rather dismissive of philosophy altogether, a view that is immediately reinforced by the second interlocutor who interrupts to explain that his rival specialises in "chokeholds" (τραχηλιζόμενος), rather than philosophy.

Socrates decides to interrogate both over the question whether philosophising is noble and admirable (kalon). The cultivated man replies that it is, and Socrates proceeds to ask him whether he actually knows what philosophy is in the first place (133c). He claims to know and answers that philosophy is essentially polymathy. With the help of his athletic rival, who knows that the good of exercise depends on being done in the right amount, not the maximum amount (134b-c), Socrates points out that the same is true of most good things, and turns to asking what kind of things the one who philosophizes (loves wisdom) ought to learn, if the object is not simply to know all or many things (135a). The cultivated rival suggests that the philosopher, while not needing to bother himself with the hands-on practicalities (cheirourgia, 135b), should aspire to a level of understanding in all the arts (technai) such that he is second only to the expert in that particular field—still a kind of polymathy. Socrates challenges this suggestion by forcing him to admit that, in any conceivable particular circumstance, the philosopher would be useless in comparison to a true expert on the matter. For example, a doctor would always be preferable to the philosopher in case of sickness, as would a pilot when in need to stir a ship.

Socrates then proceeds by developing an alternative account of the philosopher's proper interest, based on the premise that goodness (which the interlocutors have agreed in ascribing to philosophy) depends critically on the knowledge of how to tell good men from bad, and train the bad to become better, which is also the knowledge needed to deal out punishments. This knowledge, the cultivated lover agrees, is the knowledge of the one who serves as judge (hē dikastikē epistēmē, 137d). Socrates goes on to argue that this knowledge can be identified with justice, self-control, and self-knowledge, and with the arts practiced by the statesman, the king (or tyrant), and the head of a household (or master). The conclusion is that these are all in fact just one art (138c), one of paramount importance, in which the philosopher must be supreme.

When Socrates first met the rival lovers, he put little hope in conversation with the athletics enthusiast, who professed experience "in deeds (erga) and not in words (logoi)" (132d). But at the end he wins the crowd's applause by having shut up the "wiser" young man, so that it is the athletic rival who agrees with Socrates' conclusions (139a).

The entire story of the discussion is told in the first person by Socrates, without any interruption or indication what audience he addresses. At just over seven Stephanus pages, Lovers is one of the shortest dialogues in the Thrasyllan canon of Plato's works (about the same length as Hipparchus, with only Clitophon being shorter).

== Criticism ==
=== Question of authenticity ===
It is generally agreed that the dialogue was written in the second half of the fourth century BC and expresses the philosophical views, if not of Plato, then at least of an Academic writer of this period.

Stallbaum's verdict is typical of a long-held scholarly consensus: the language and style are irreproachable and worthy of Plato or Xenophon, but the material is not developed in a way worthy of Plato's philosophical mind. Gerard Ledger's stylometric analysis of Plato's works did not find the expected statistical similarities between the Greek of Lovers and that of Plato's acknowledged works, instead showing a closer statistical match between this dialogue (as also Hippias Minor) and the works of Xenophon. If the dialogue is post-Platonic, then perhaps it argues against Aristotle's insistence that the kinds of authority wielded by a king, a politician, and a master are multiple and essentially separate from each other. (On the other hand, it is possible that Aristotle refers in his works to Lovers).

=== Rehabilitation ===
In a 1985 article, Julia Annas made a notable defense of the dialogue's possible value as an authentically Platonic production. Annas disagrees that the burden of proof need be on the proponent of the work's authenticity and proceeds from the premise that Lovers "contain[s] no decisive indications either for or against authenticity" and that the most any investigation can accomplish is to "make it plausible that the Lovers is an early work by Plato." Her several arguments that this is plausible center on the claim that, if Lovers and First Alcibiades are genuine, they provide an otherwise missing background in Plato's thinking against which to understand his treatment of self-knowledge in Charmides.
