= Ion (dialogue) =

Dialogue by Plato

In Plato's Ion (/ˈaɪɒn/; Ancient Greek: Ἴων) Socrates discusses with the titular character, a professional rhapsode who also lectures on Homer, the question of whether the rhapsode, a performer of poetry, gives his performance on account of his skill and knowledge or by virtue of divine possession. It is one of the shortest of Plato's dialogues.

== Dramatis personae ==
- Socrates, the Greek philosopher. In this dialogue, he questions the nature of art and of divine inspiration.
- Ion of Ephesus, the rhapsode. In poetry, he specialized in the works of Homer. The city of Ephesus was under Athenian control at this time and Athens had lost many of its beloved generals in the recent Sicilian expedition. Athens was in the process of hiring foreign mercenaries so Socrates' suggestion that Ion should serve as a general to the Athenian soldiers is not the non-sequitur it may at first appear when these circumstances are taken into account.

== Dialogue summary ==
=== Ion's skill: Is it genuine? (530a–533c) ===
Ion has just come from a festival of Asclepius at the city of Epidaurus, after having won first prize in the competition. Socrates engages him in discussion and Ion explains how his knowledge and skill is limited to Homer, whom he claims to understand better than anyone alive. Socrates finds this puzzling as to him it seems that Homer treats many of the same subjects as other poets like Hesiod, subjects such as war or divination, and that if someone is knowledgeable in any one of those he should be able to understand what both of these poets say. Furthermore, this man is probably not a poet like Ion, but a specialist like a doctor, who knows better about nutrition.

=== The nature of poetic inspiration (533d–536d) ===
Socrates deduces from this observation that Ion has no real skill, but is like a soothsayer or prophet in being divinely possessed:

"For not by art do they utter these things, but by divine influence; since, if they had fully learned by art to speak on one kind of theme, they would know how to speak on all. And for this reason God takes away the mind of these men and uses them as his ministers, just as he does soothsayers and godly seers, in order that we who hear them may know that it is not they who utter these words of great price, when they are out of their wits, but that it is God himself who speaks and addresses us through them." (534b–d)

Socrates offers the metaphor of a magnet to explain how the rhapsode transmits the poet's original inspiration from the muse to the audience. He says that the god speaks first to the poet, then gives the rhapsode his skill, and thus, gods communicate to the people. Socrates posits that Ion must be out of his mind when he acts, because he can weep even though he has lost nothing, and recoil in fear when in front of an admiring audience. Ion says that the explanation for this is very simple: it is the promise of payment that inspires his deliberate disconnection from reality. Ion says that when he looks at the audience and sees them weeping, he knows he will laugh because it has made him richer, and that when they laugh, he will be weeping at losing the money (535e).

=== Ion's choice: To be skilled or inspired (536e–542a) ===
Ion tells Socrates that he cannot be convinced that he is possessed or mad when he performs (536d,e). Socrates then recites passages from Homer which concern various arts such as medicine, divining, fishing, and making war. He asks Ion if these skills are distinct from his art of recitation. Ion admits that while Homer discusses many different skills in his poetry, he never refers specifically to the rhapsode's craft, which is acting. Socrates presses him about the exact nature of his skill. Ion maintains that his knowledge makes him a capable military general but states that when he recites passages concerning military matters, he cannot tell whether he does it with a general's skill, or with a rhapsode's. Socrates notices that Ion changes his occupation. He was first a rhapsode and then has become a general. He asks Ion why he flip flops from one profession to the other and Ion states that Athens is currently not in need of generals, especially foreign-born ones. Socrates lists off a few foreign-born Athenian generals of the time and the rhapsode backtracks. Socrates gently berates the rhapsode for being Protean, which after all, is exactly what a rhapsode is: a man who is convincingly capable of being different people on stage.

Through his character Socrates, Plato argues that "Ion’s talent as an interpreter cannot be an art, a definable body of knowledge or an ordered system of skills," but instead must come from the divine inspiration of the Muses.

== Commentary ==
Plato's argument is that Ion, the rhapsode, "dangles like a lodestone at the end of a chain of lodestones. The muse inspires the poet (Homer in Ion’s case) and the poet inspires the rhapsode." The idea of divine madness also holds specific significance to Socrates because during his defense in The Apology, he mentions his philosophy and his actions as having been guided by a voice from above. The daimonion would warn him against making mistakes but would never directly order him to do something. Plato develops a more elaborate critique of poetry in other dialogues such as in Phaedrus 245a, Symposium 209a, Republic 398a, Laws 817 b–d. Gregory Vlastos perceives it as a critique of unjustified belief rather than a critique of poetry in general.

== Authenticity ==
Various readers of the past, starting with Goethe and Schleiermacher, have doubted the Platonic authorship of this dialogue.

Schleiermacher's doubt stems from his early dating of the Phaedrus. This objection and many others persisted until the end of the 20th century; however, more recent studies in the field of dialogue research tend to acknowledge in unanimous agreement the dialogue as Platonic.

Percy Bysshe Shelley translated the work from late 1819 to 1821 but it remained unpublished until 1840 when it appeared in the collection 1840 Essays, Letters from Abroad, Translations and Fragments, (Volume 1), edited by Mary Shelley. The compilation was published by Edward Moxon in London. Shelley saw it as an authentic work by Plato, relying primarily on its core theme of divine poetic inspiration. He posited it as a philosophical counter-argument to Thomas Love Peacock's essay The Four Ages of Poetry, in which he maintained that poetry was obsolete and useless in the modern world, being superseded by science.

== Texts and translations ==
- Plato. Opera, volume III. Oxford Classical Texts. ISBN 978-0198145424
- Plato. Complete Works. Ed. J. M. Cooper and D. S. Hutchinson. Hackett, 1997. ISBN 978-0872203495

== See also ==
- Poetics
- Aristotle's Poetics
- Theia mania
- Divine inspiration
