= First Alcibiades =

Platonic dialogue

The First Alcibiades, also referred to as Alcibiades Major and abbreviated as Alcibiades I (Greek: Ἀλκιβιάδης αʹ), is a dialogue ascribed to Plato, depicting Socrates in conversation with Alcibiades.

== Content ==
In the preface Alcibiades is described as an ambitious young man who is eager to enter public life. He is extremely proud of his good looks, noble birth, many friends, possessions and his connection to Pericles, the leader of the Athenian state. Alcibiades has many admirers and had many lovers but they have all run away, afraid of his coldness. Socrates was the first of his lovers but he has not spoken to him for many years. Now the older man tries to help the youth with his questions before Alcibiades presents himself in front of the Athenian assembly. For the rest of the dialogue Socrates explains the many reasons why Alcibiades needs him. By the end of Alcibiades I, the youth is much persuaded by Socrates' reasoning, and accepts him as his mentor.

The first topic they enter is the essence of politics – war and peace. Socrates claims that people should fight on just grounds, but he doubts that Alcibiades has any knowledge about justice. Prodded by Socrates’ questioning, Alcibiades admits that he has never learned the nature of justice from a master nor has discovered it by himself.

Alcibiades suggests that politics is not about justice but expediency and the two principles could be opposed. Socrates persuades him that he is mistaken, and there is no expediency without justice. The humiliated youth concedes that he knows nothing about politics.

Later Alcibiades says that he is not concerned about his ignorance because all the other Athenian politicians are ignorant. Socrates reminds him that his true rivals are the kings of Sparta and Persia. He delivers a long lecture about the careful education, glorious might and unparalleled richness of these foreign rulers. Alcibiades gets cold feet which was exactly the purpose of Socrates’ speech.

After this interlude the dialogue proceeds with further questioning about the rules of society. Socrates points to the many contradictions in Alcibiades’ thoughts. Later they agree that man has to follow the advice of the famous Delphic phrase: gnōthi seautón meaning know thyself. They discuss that the "ruling principle" of man is not the body but the soul. Somebody's true lover loves his soul, while the lover of the body flies as soon as the youth fades. With this Socrates proves that he is the only true lover of Alcibiades. "From this day forward, I must and will follow you as you have followed me; I will be the disciple, and you shall be my master", proclaims the youth. Together they will work on to improve Alcibiades' character because only the virtuous has the right to govern. Tyrannical power should not be the aim of individuals but people accept to be commanded by a superior.

In the last sentence Socrates expresses his hope that Alcibiades will persist, but he has fears because the power of the state "may be too much" for both of them.

== Authenticity ==
In antiquity Alcibiades I was regarded as the best text to introduce one to Platonic philosophy and its authenticity was never doubted. It was not until the 19th century that the German scholar Friedrich Schleiermacher argued against the ascription to Plato. Subsequently, its popularity declined. However, stylometric research supports Plato's authorship, and some scholars have recently defended its authenticity.

== Dating ==
Traditionally, the First Alcibiades has been considered an early dialogue. Gerard Ledger's stylometric analysis supported this tradition, dating the work to the 390s. Julia Annas, in supporting the authenticity of Rival Lovers, saw both dialogues as laying the foundation for ideas Plato would later develop in Charmides.

A later dating has also been defended. Nicholas Denyer suggests that it was written in the 350s BC, when Plato, back in Athens, could reflect on the similarities between Dionysius II of Syracuse (as we know him from the Seventh Letter) and Alcibiades — two young men interested in philosophy but compromised by their ambition and faulty early education. This hypothesis requires skepticism about what is usually regarded as the only fairly certain result of Platonic stylometry, Plato's marked tendency to avoid hiatus in the six dialogues widely believed to have been composed in the period to which Denyer assigns First Alcibiades (Timaeus, Critias, Sophist, Statesman, Philebus, and Laws).

A compromise solution to the difficult issues of dating attending the linguistic features of First Alcibiades has also been sought in the hypothesis that the first two-thirds of the dialogue was written by some other member of the Platonic Academy, whose efforts were completed by Plato himself in his late-middle period.

R.S. Bluck, although unimpressed by previous arguments against the dialogue's authenticity, tentatively suggests a date after the end of Plato's life, approximately 343/2 BC, based especially on "a striking parallelism between the Alcibiades and early works of Aristotle, as well as certain other compositions that probably belong to the same period as the latter."

== Bibliography ==
- Denyer, Nicholas, "introduction", in Plato, Alcibiades, Nicholas Denyer (ed.) (Cambridge: Cambridge University Press, 2001): 1-26.
- Foucault, Michel, The Hermeneutics of the Subject: Lectures at the Collège de France, 1981–1982 (New York: Picador, 2005).
- Young, Charles M., "Plato and Computer Dating", in Nicholas D. Smith (ed.), Plato: Critical Assessments volume 1: General Issues of Interpretation (London: Routledge, 1998): 29–49.
