= Second Alcibiades =

Dialogue ascribed to Plato

The Second Alcibiades or Alcibiades II (Greek: Ἀλκιβιάδης βʹ) is a dialogue traditionally ascribed to Plato. In it, Socrates attempts to persuade Alcibiades that it is unsafe for him to pray to the gods if he does not know whether what he prays for is actually good or bad for him.

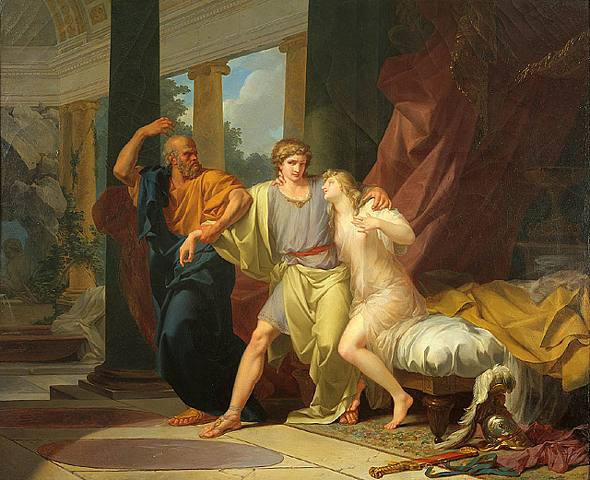
Second Alcibiades

There is dispute amongst scholars about the text's authenticity, and it is generally considered apocryphal. The main criticisms of its authenticity revolve around its defective arguments, lack of humor, and style; those who consider it inauthentic date its composition to the 3rd or 2nd centuries BC.

== Synopsis ==
Socrates meets Alcibiades while the latter was on his way to pray, and warns him that one must be careful what he prays for, since the gods might actually grant his wishes. Alcibiades replies that one must be mad to pray for something harmful, but Socrates corrects him by saying that if ignorance was equated to madness, and considering the ignorant are so many, they would be in grave danger with all these lunatics running around (139d). Rather, madness and ignorance are subsets of a larger thing, which is the opposite of wisdom. Like various ailments are all opposites of health without being identical, so the opposites of wisdom are many, madness and ignorance among them, but also a form of "romanticism", megalópsūkhos in the original text (140c). Alcibiades stands corrected, and Socrates continues with the main question of whether he, Alcibiades, would ever wish something harmful. As an example, Socrates affirms that he is certain, that had the god granted Alcibiades the rule of Greece, he would have accepted. With his question Socrates could also be playing on Alcibiades' ambitious nature, that was known throughout Greece and was immortalised in Thucydides' history. Alcibiades naturally agrees and Socrates reminds him of how named rulers like Archelaus of Macedon had been murdered or expelled from their cities. So what seems better, Socrates says, is what a certain poem said some time ago: "King Zeus, give unto us what is good, whether we pray or pray not; But what is grievous, even if we pray for it, do thou avert" (143a).

Alcibiades grants Socrates that what he had just said was indeed the best practice when it comes to prayers, but surprisingly, Socrates continues by saying that they shouldn't dismiss ignorance so quickly, and cites by way of example, the ignorance of bad things. If one for example was to commit a murder but couldn't remember the face of their future victim, then this type of ignorance can actually be considered good, so that, for those predisposed towards evil, ignorance is preferable than knowledge. If knowledge is partial, and is not a part of wisdom, which includes where and how this knowledge is to be practiced, then it can be dangerous. The orators then who go around Athens encouraging its citizens towards or against war, and to the degree they cannot describe the precise length or ideal location of this war, are acting as fools despite being knowledgeable in war's theories. For all these reasons Socrates concludes, it is wiser to copy the Spartans who, according to this dialogue, pray simply and in private (149a) while remaining victorious in battle and postpone the sacrifice that Alcibiades was planning until his head is clearer and he can distinguish more readily between good and evil (150e).

Alcibiades agrees and thanks Socrates, offering his garland crown to him. Socrates accepts and recalls of a similar in one of Euripides plays, where the seer Tiresias is likewise crowned for his wisdom, while the "wave-tossed" (ἐν κλύδωνι κείμεθ') king considers it a good omen. In similar fashion, Socrates, famously in love with young Alcibiades, and feeling likewise "wave-tossed" wants to consider this "coronation" a good omen and "would like to come off victorious over your lovers" (151c).
