= Alfred Edward Taylor =

British philosopher (1869–1945)

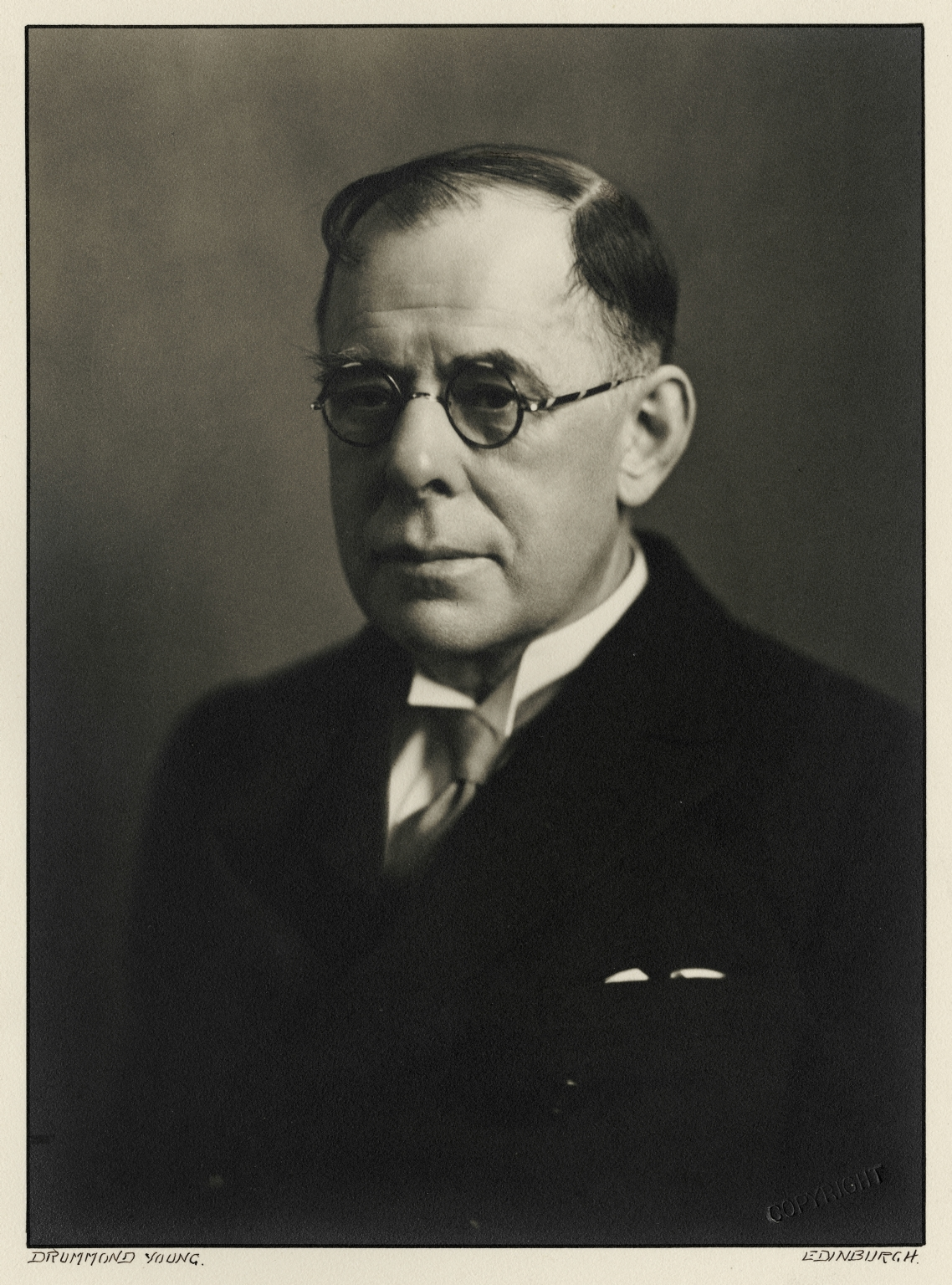
- Born: 22 December 1869; Oundle, England
- Died: 31 October 1945 (aged 75); Edinburgh, Scotland

Education
- Education: New College, Oxford

Philosophical work
- Era: 20th-century philosophy
- Region: Western philosophy
- School: British idealism Neo-Hegelianism
- Institutions: New College, Oxford; Merton College, Oxford; McGill University, Montreal; University of St. Andrews; University of Edinburgh
- Notable students: John McIntyre; Thomas F. Torrance
- Main interests: Metaphysics; Philosophy of religion Moral philosophy Scholarship of Plato; Scholarship of Hobbes
- Notable ideas: The Taylor thesis (non-egoistic interpretation of Hobbesian ethics)

Alfred Edward Taylor (22 December 1869 – 31 October 1945) was a British idealist philosopher most famous for his contributions to the philosophy of idealism in his writings on metaphysics, the philosophy of religion, moral philosophy, and the scholarship of Plato. He was a fellow of the British Academy (1911) and president of the Aristotelian Society from 1928 to 1929. At Oxford he was made an honorary fellow of New College in 1931. In an age of universal upheaval and strife, he was a notable defender of idealism in the Anglophone world.

== Career ==
Taylor was both a philosopher in his own right, addressing all the central problems of philosophy, and a philosophical scholar.

Educated at Oxford in the closing days of the great European idealist movement, Taylor was early influenced by the school of British idealism, especially neo-Hegelianism. At New College, he obtained a First in Literae Humaniores or 'Greats' in 1891 and held a prize fellowship at Merton College, Oxford (1891–96); he was re-elected as a Fellow in 1902.

He served as a lecturer at Owens College, Manchester (1898–1903) and then as professor of logic and metaphysics at McGill University, Montreal (1903–1908).

His first major book, Elements of Metaphysics (1903), dedicated (in heartfelt acknowledgment) to F. H. Bradley, is a systematic treatise of metaphysics covering such topics as ontology, cosmology, and rational psychology, and influenced by scholars including Josiah Royce, James Ward, George Frederick Stout, Richard Avenarius, and Hugo Munsterberg, as well as Robert Adamson, Wilhelm Ostwald, Bertrand Russell, and even Louis Couturat.

In later years, most notably in The Faith of a Moralist, Taylor began to move away from certain doctrines of his early idealistic youth, towards a more mature and comprehensive idealist philosophy. While students at Oxford and Cambridge were in thrall of anti-idealism, Taylor for many years influenced generations of young people at the University of St. Andrews (1908–1924) and the University of Edinburgh (1924–1941), two of the most ancient and prestigious universities of the United Kingdom, where he was Professor of Moral Philosophy. (Although he retired from his position at Edinburgh in 1941, he continued to teach and fulfil the other duties of the chair during the war until a successor was appointed in 1944.)

As a philosophical scholar he is considered, alongside Francis Macdonald Cornford, one of the greatest English Platonists of his time. In the first half of the 20th century, Taylor remained, in a reactionary age of anti-metaphysics and growing political irrationalism, a lonely but stalwart defender of 19th-century European philosophical idealism in the English-speaking world.

But his scholarship was not confined to Greek philosophy. In 1938 Taylor published a landmark article, "The Ethical Doctrine of Hobbes." This paper, as Stuart Brown notes, "advanced the bold thesis that Hobbes’s ethical theory is logically independent of the egoistic psychology and is a strict deontology." Both Taylor (1938) and Brown (1959) were reprinted in Hobbes Studies (1965). The deontological angle was developed, though with divergencies from Taylor's argument, by Howard Warrender in The Political Philosophy of Hobbes (1957).

== Major contributions ==
As a scholar of Plato, he is perhaps most famous for, from his Varia Socratica (1911) onwards, presenting evidence in support of the position that the vast majority of the statements of Socrates in the Platonic dialogues accurately depict ideas of the historical man himself. His magnum opus, Plato: The Man and His Work (1926) and his Commentary on Plato's Timaeus (1927) are particularly important contributions to the higher learning of his time. In the latter work, according to W. D. Ross, Taylor held that "Plato puts into Timaeus’ mouth only views which Timaeus held or at least could have held."

In moral philosophy he explored such issues as free will and the relationship between rightness and goodness. Taylor was greatly influenced by the thought of classical antiquity, by such philosophers as Plato and Aristotle, as well as medieval scholasticism.

His contribution to the philosophy of religion is mainly his 1926–28 Gifford Lectures, printed as The Faith of a Moralist (1930). Taylor made many contributions to the philosophical journal, Mind. He wrote some of the major articles in James Hastings' Encyclopedia of Religion and Ethics.

== Selected works ==
- The Problem of Conduct: A Study in the Phenomenology of Ethics. London: Macmillan. 1901. OCLC 2166791.
- Aristotle on his predecessors; being the first book of his Metaphysics. Chicago: Open Court. 1907. OCLC 269871.
- Thomas Hobbes. London: Constable. 1908. OCLC 50458.
- Plato. London: Constable. 1908. OCLC 157751.
- Elements of Metaphysics. London: Methuen. 1924 [1909]. OCLC 5902259.
- Epicurus. London: Constable. 1911. OCLC 3054279.
- Varia Socratica: first series. Oxford: Parker. 1911. OCLC 3511698.
- Plato's Biography of Socrates. London: British Academy. 1917. OCLC 1436017.
- Aristotle. London: T C & E C Jack. 1943 [1919]. OCLC 259497.
- Platonism and Its Influence. London: Harrap. 1924. OCLC 405563.
- Plato: the Man and his Work. London: Methuen. 1949 [1926]. OCLC 18981018.
- David Hume and the Miraculous: the Leslie Stephen Lecture for 1927. Cambridge: Cambridge University Press. 1927. OCLC 3663134. reprinted in Philosophical Studies (1934)
- A Commentary on Plato's Timaeus. Oxford: Clarendon Press. 1928. OCLC 422028.
- The Faith of a Moralist. London: Macmillan. 1930. OCLC 302893.
- Plato and the Authorship of the Epinomis. London: British Academy. 1930. OCLC 1957814.
- Socrates: The Man and His Thought. Peter Davies Limited. 1933. OCLC 4146771.
- Philosophical Studies. London: Macmillan. 1934. OCLC 448206.
- The Christian Hope of Immortality. London: Macmillan. 1938. OCLC 385561.
- Does God exist?. London: Macmillan. 1945. OCLC 1840193.
