= Laws (dialogue) =

Platonic dialogue

The Laws (Ancient Greek: Νόμοι) is Plato's last and longest dialogue. The conversation depicted in the work's twelve books begins with the question of who is given the credit for establishing a civilization's laws. Its musings on the ethics of government and law have frequently been compared to Plato's more widely read Republic. Some scholars see this as the work of Plato as an older man having failed in his effort to guide the rule of the tyrant Dionysius II of Syracuse. These events are alluded to in the Seventh Letter. The text is noteworthy as the only Platonic dialogue not to feature Socrates.

== Setting ==
=== Characters ===
Unlike most of Plato's dialogues, Socrates does not appear in the Laws. The conversation is instead led by an Athenian Stranger

- An Athenian "Stranger" (Ancient Greek: ξένος)
- Cleinias of Knossos
- Megillus of Sparta

== Summary ==
The Athenian Stranger joins the other two on their religious pilgrimage from Knossos, on Crete, to the cave of Zeus on Mount Ida. The entire dialogue takes place during this journey, which mimics the action of Minos: said by the Cretans to have made their ancient laws, Minos walked this path every nine years in order to receive instruction from Zeus on lawgiving. It is also said to be the longest day of the year, allowing for the densely packed twelve books. The question asked at the beginning is not "What is law?" as one would expect. That is the question of the Platonic dialogue Minos. The dialogue rather proceeds from the question, "who it is that receives credit for creating laws." By the end of the third book Cleinias announces that he has in fact been given the responsibility of creating the laws for a new Cretan colony, and that he would like the Athenian stranger's assistance. The rest of the dialogue proceeds with the three old men, walking towards the cave and making laws for this new city which is called the city of Magnesia.

=== Books I–II: Purpose of government ===
While traveling from Knossos to the shrine of Zeus on Mount Ida, the Athenian begins by asking if the other two attribute their laws to a divine or a human origin. Both Clinias and Megillus say that their laws have a divine origin. The laws of Crete are said to come from Minos and Rhadamanthus, who consulted with Zeus.

== Interpretations and themes ==
The questions of the Laws are quite numerous, including:

- Divine revelation, divine law and law-giving
- The role of intelligence in law-giving
- The relations of philosophy, religion, and politics
- The role of music, exercise and dance in education
- Natural law and natural right

The dialogue uses primarily the Athenian and Spartan (Lacedaemonian) law systems as background for pinpointing a choice of laws, which the speakers imagine as a more or less coherent set for the new city they are talking about.

=== Ontological priority of soul ===
The tenth book of the Laws most famously discusses the priority of soul: both explanatory priority and ontological priority. Plato here refutes the views of his predecessors who argued that soul (and what soul is related to, such as intelligence, knowledge, skill, etc.) is posterior to corporeal things such as earth and fire. The natural philosophers had explained soul, intelligence, and so on, in terms of corporeal things: corporeal things exist first and give rise to psychic phenomena. In contrast, Plato argues that soul is first, both as that in terms of which corporeal things ought to be explained and as that which gives rise to the corporeal world. Plato concludes this by relying on his view that the soul is intelligent and a self-mover and that soul is that which supervises the cosmos. There is an important scholarly discussion of whether Plato means to allow for there to be an evil soul governing the cosmos, alongside a virtuous soul. Gabriela Carone, for instance, maintains that Plato "does not dismiss the existence of a kind of evil soul as such." But more-recent scholarship has argued otherwise. In general, recent scholars have understood Plato's psychology to be such that souls are by their very nature intelligent (for it is by means of their intelligence that they move things), and that Plato's view of intelligence requires that intelligent things not be vicious; this rules out the very possibility of an evil soul.

=== Comparison with Plato's Republic ===
The Laws, like the earlier Republic, concerns the making of a city in speech. Yet it is in opposition to the earlier dialogue, and the constitution of the hypothetical Magnesia described in the Laws differs from that of Kallipolis described in the Republic, on several key points. The city of the Laws differs in its allowance of private property and private families, and in the very existence of written laws, from the city of the Republic, with its property-system and community of wives for the guardians, and absence of written law.

[636b] So these common meals, for example, and these gymnasia, while they are at present beneficial to the States in many other respects, yet in the event of civil strife they prove dangerous (as is shown by the case of the youth of Miletus, Bocotia and Thurii);1 and, moreover, this institution, when of old standing, is thought to have corrupted the pleasures of love which are natural not to men only but also natural to beasts. For this your States are held primarily responsible, and along with them all others that especially encourage the use of gymnasia. And whether one makes the observation in earnest or in jest, one certainly should not fail to observe that when male unites with female for procreation the pleasure experienced is held to be due to nature, but contrary to nature when male mates with male or female with female, and that those first guilty of such enormities were impelled by their slavery to pleasure. And we all accuse the Cretans of concocting the story about Ganymede to justify their "unnatural pleasures".

— Plato's Laws 636b

Also, whereas the Republic is a dialogue between Socrates and several young men, the Laws is a discussion among three old men contriving a device for reproductive law, with a view of hiding from virile youth their rhetorical strategy of piety, rituals and virtue.

[838e] "I stated that in reference to this law I know of a device for making a natural use of reproductive intercourse,—on the one hand, by abstaining from the male and not slaying of set purpose the human stock, [839a] nor sowing seed on rocks and stones where it can never take root and have fruitful increase; and, on the other hand, by abstaining from every female field in which you would not desire the seed to spring up ..." (and continuing) [839b] "... Possibly, however, some young bystander, rash and of superabundant virility, on hearing of the passing of this law, would denounce us for making foolish and impossible rules, and fill all the place with his outcries ..."

— Plato's Laws 838e

The city of the Laws is described as "second best" not because the city of the Republic is the best, but because it is the city of gods and their children.

Traditionally, the Minos is thought to be the preface, and the Epinomis the epilogue, to the Laws, but these are generally considered by scholars to be spurious.

=== Comparisons to other works on Ancient Greek law ===
Plato was not the only Ancient Greek author writing about the law systems of his day, and making comparisons between the Athenian and the Spartan laws. Notably, the Constitution of the Spartans by Xenophon, the Constitution of the Athenians, wrongly attributed to Xenophon, and the Constitution of the Athenians, possibly by Aristotle or one of his students, have also survived. Some centuries later Plutarch would also devote attention to the topic of Ancient Greek law systems, e.g. in his Life of Lycurgus. Lycurgus was the legendary law-giver of the Lacedaemonians. Plutarch compares Lycurgus and his Spartan laws to the law system Numa Pompilius supposedly introduced in Rome around 700 BC. Both pseudo-Xenophon and Plutarch are stark admirers of the Spartan system, showing less reserve than Plato in expressing that admiration.

== Reception ==
The impact of the Laws in antiquity was substantial. It is possible that Plato's contemporary Isocrates already took an interest in the work. Aristotle, who was critical of the dialogue, created a collection of excerpts from the extensive work. Aristotle incorrectly included the Laws as one of Plato's dialogues featuring Socrates; perhaps he knew another version in which Socrates appears, but most likely did not express himself clearly. Aristotle brought the Laws closely in line with Plato's Republic and considered both works largely in agreement with one other. He viewed the Athenian's proposed number of 5,000 citizens fit to bear arms as too high. According to Aristotle, the resulting unproductivity of the citizens would necessitate a large number of women and servants, which would, in turn, require a large territory. Aristotle sees another problem in the unchanging number of households amidst an increasing number of children. Aristotle notes that Plato does require a mixed constitution. However, he points out that Plato does not represent any element of a monarchy. In Aristotle's view, Plato's democratic portion is not profitable, while the oligarchical dominates. Aristotle's examination of the Laws shaped large portions of Books 7 and 8 of his Politics.

The author of the dialogue Epinomis – generally considered to be Philippus of Opus – developed his work as a continuation of the Laws. As such, he let the same three persons appear in the dialogue as Plato: the Athenian, Cleinias, and Megillus. Just like Plato, he gave the Athenian the central role. In some instances, the views of the Athenian in Epinomis deviate from those of the Athenian in the Laws.

Georgios Gemistos, who called himself Plethon in his later life, wrote and named his Nómōn syngraphḗ (Νόμων συγγραφή) or Nómoi (Νόμοι, "Book of Laws") after the Laws dialogue.

== Manuscripts ==
- Papyrus Oxyrhynchus 23

== Published editions ==
- — (1804). Evens, R. H. (ed.). The laws.
- — (1845). Lewis, Taylor (ed.). Against the atheists, or the tenth book of the dialogue on laws. New York: Harper & Brothers. (Greek text only)
- — (1859). Burges, George (ed.). The laws. The Works of Plato: A new and literal version chiefly from the text of Stallbaum / Bohn's Classical Library. Translated by Cary, Henry. London: Henry G. Bohn. (literal translation) Also available in audio.
- — (1875). Laws . Translated by Jowett, Benjamin – via Wikisource. (nonliteral translation) Also available via Project Gutenberg
- — (1921). England, E. B. (ed.). The Laws of Plato. Classical Series. University of Manchester. (Greek text only, no English translation)
- — (1926). Capps, E.; Page, T. E.; Rouse, W. H. D. (eds.). Plato in twelve volumes: Laws. Loeb Classical Library. Translated by Bury, Robert Gregg. Harvard University Press / Heinemann. (Greek and English text parallel) Volume 1, Volume 2
- — (1934). Taylor, A. E. (ed.). The laws of Plato. Translated by Taylor, A. E. London: J. M. Dent & Sons.
- — (1961). Hamilton, E.; Cairns, H.; Cooper, L. (eds.). The Collected Dialogues of Plato. Bollingen Series (General). Princeton University Press. pp. 1225ff. ISBN 978-1-4008-3586-7.
- — (2008). Mayhew, Robert (ed.). Plato: Laws 10: Translated with an Introduction and Commentary. Clarendon Plato Series. Translated by Mayhew, Robert. Oxford University Press. ISBN 978-0-19-922596-5.
- — (2015). Meyer, S. S. (ed.). Plato: Laws 1 and 2. Clarendon Plato series. Translated by Meyer, S. S. Oxford University Press. ISBN 978-0-19-960408-1.
- Plato (1988). Pangle, Thomas L. (ed.). The Laws of Plato. Classics, political science, philosophy. Translated by Pangle, Thomas L. University of Chicago Press. ISBN 978-0-226-67110-9.
- — (2016). Schofield, Malcolm (ed.). Plato: Laws. Cambridge Texts in the History of Political Thought. Translated by Griffith, Tom. Cambridge University Press. ISBN 978-1-316-49529-2.

== See also ==
- Gymnasium
- Gymnopaedia
- Highly composite number
- Mixed government
