= Hipparchus (dialogue) =

Work attributed to Plato

The Hipparchus (/hɪˈpɑːrkəs/; Ancient Greek: Ἵππαρχος), or Hipparch, is a dialogue attributed to the classical Greek philosopher and writer Plato. Like many of Plato's original works, Socrates is featured trying to define a single term, "love of gain" in this case, or philokerdēs (φιλοκερδές) in the original text.

There is some debate as to the work's authenticity. Stylistically, the dialogue bears many similarities to the Minos. They are the only dialogues between Socrates and a single anonymous companion; they are the only dialogues where the titles bear the name of someone long-dead; and they are the only dialogues which begin with Socrates raising a "what is" question. Thus, many scholars conclude that both were written by the same author, probably soon after the middle of the fourth century BC.

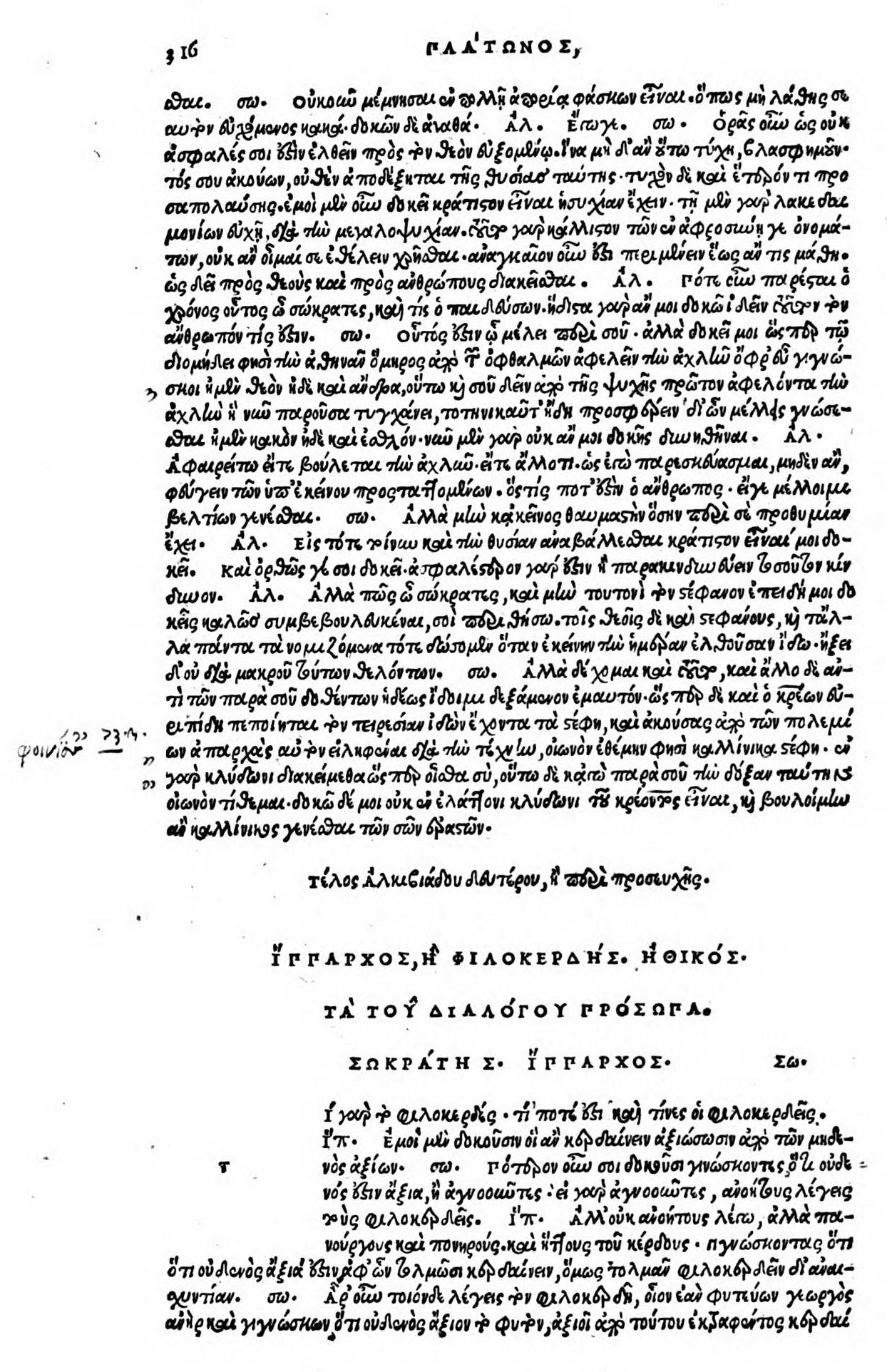
Hipparchus

In the dialogue, Socrates recounts the life of Hipparchus, an alleged tyrant of 6th century Athens and son of the famous ruler Peisistratus. Hipparchus was known for his maxims. One was "Walk thinking just thoughts, and the other was "Do not deceive a friend." Thus there is second theme in the dialogue concerning intellectual honesty in dialectical discussion.

== Synopsis ==
Socrates discusses with a friend who, in contrast with other Platonic dialogues, is not the Hipparchus of title, and remains unnamed throughout the text. The dialogue opens with a direct question by which Socrates sets the theme for the entire discussion, namely "what is love of gain" (τί γὰρ τὸ φιλοκερδές). His friend answers that it's considering it "worth while to make gain out of things of no worth" (225a), which Socrates proves impossible, as all men who make gains have knowledge of their vocation, and know worthy from worthless in their particular domain (225b-226d). Socrates continues by asserting that gain is good and loss is evil, to which his friend agrees (227a), and then moves to show that since all men want what is good, necessarily, all men must love gain (227c).

Socrates's friend suggests the two of them need to redefine their term if the argument is going to progress, and suggests that a "love of gains" is one who "thinks fit to make gain from, things from which honest men do not dare" (227d). All gain is good, he says, but some gain incurs a "net loss" when it harms the gainer (227e). Socrates reminds his friend they agreed that gain is good, so it can do no harm, and suggests that he is being dishonest with him. The discussion then digresses into a story (228b-229d) about Hipparchus, son of the famous Peisistratus, who became known for his sayings, one of which apparently was "never deceive a friend", which is why Socrates mentions the story as a complaint. The story mentions a curious version of Hipparchus's death, as killed by two other Athenians over the admiration of a young boy.

The dialogue concludes with Socrates proving to his friend, who agrees unwillingly, that all gain is good.
