= List of manuscripts of Plato's dialogues =

The following is a partial list of manuscripts of Plato's dialogues.

== Contents ==
The traditional division of the works of Plato into tetralogies was done by Thrasyllus of Mendes. The list includes works of doubtful authenticity (in italic), as well as the Letters.

- 1st tetralogy
  - Euthyphro, Apology, Crito, Phaedo
- 2nd tetralogy
  - Cratylus, Theaetetus, Sophist, Statesman
- 3rd tetralogy
  - Parmenides, Philebus, Symposium, Phaedrus
- 4th tetralogy
  - Alcibiades I, Alcibiades II, Hipparchus, Lovers
- 5th tetralogy
  - Theages, Charmides, Laches, Lysis
- 6th tetralogy
  - Euthydemus, Protagoras, Gorgias, Meno
- 7th tetralogy
  - Hippias Major, Hippias Minor, Ion, Menexenus
- 8th tetralogy
  - Clitophon, Republic, Timaeus, Critias
- 9th tetralogy
  - Minos, Laws, Epinomis, Letters

Following these tetralogies is an appendix of works whose genuineness was disputed in antiquity: Definitions, Epigrams, On Justice, On Virtue, Demodocus, Sisyphus, Halcyon, Eryxias, Axiochus

Other works frequently transmitted in manuscripts with the works of Plato include the Platonic handbooks of Albinus and Alcinous, Diogenes Laertius's Life of Plato, Theon of Smyrna's Mathematics Useful For Understanding Plato, the Pythagorean Golden Verses, a pseudigraphic speech attributed to Timaeus of Locri that purports to be the "original" version of the Timaeus, Plutarch's On the Creation of the Soul in the Timaeus, and commentaries on dialogues by the Neoplatonist philosophers Hermias, Proclus, Damascius, and Olympiodorus.

== Minuscules ==
Some 250 known minuscule manuscripts of Plato survive.

=== Medieval ===
This is a list of pre-16th century manuscripts in Greek minuscule that constitute the main basis for the text of Plato's works.

Name	Date	Budé	Bekker	Online	Content	Notes
Codex Oxoniensis Clarkianus 39	9th century	B	𝔄		first six tetralogies	
Codex Parisinus gr. 1807	9th century	A	A		last two tetralogies and the appendix	
Codex Vaticanus gr. 1	9th-10th centuries	O	Ω		Laws, Epinomis, Letters, Appendix	
Codex Palatinus gr. 173	10th-11th centuries	P	𝔡		Apology, Phaedo, Alcibiades I, Gorgias, Meno, Hippias I, Theaetetus, Symposium, Phaedrus, Timaeus, Republic, Laws, Letters, Protagoras, Scholia, Parmenides, Epinomis, Epigrams	Works beginning with Theaetetus are a mixture of excerpts, paraphrases, and scholia.
Codex Parisinus Sup gr. 668	11th century				Crito, Phaedo, Cratylus	Cratylus cuts off after 404b
Codex Tübingensis Mb 14	11th century	C	𝔗		Euthyphro, Crito, Phaedo, Parmenides, Alcibiades I, Alcibiades II, Timaeus	
Codex Vindobonensis sup. phil. gr. 7	11th-12th century	W			Tetralogies I-VII, Clitophon, Republic, Timaeus, Timaeus Locrus	prefaced with Albinus' Introduction
Codex Laurentianus plut.Conv Soppr gr. 42	12th century				Republic	
Codex Venetus Marcianus gr. 185	12th century	D	Π		Timaeus Locrus, Tetralogies I-IV, Clitophon, Republic	Sophist is missing and Sisyphus is in its place.
Codex Venetus Marcianus App. gr. IV, 1	12th century	T			Timaeus Locrus, Plutarch's On the Generation of the Soul, Tetralogies I-VII, Clitophon, Republic, Timaeus	
Codex Laurentianus plut. 85.6	13th century		𝔞		First six tetralogies, Ion, Clitophon, Timaeus, Hippias I, Hippias II, Menexenus, Republic	Republic only Books I and II
Codex Parisinus gr. 1808	13th century		B		first seven tetralogies, appendix beginning with On Justice, Golden Verses, Timaeus Locrus	
Codex Parisinus gr. 1810	13th century		D		Euthyphro, Apology, Crito, Phaedrus along with the commentary of Hermias, Timaeus Locrus, Parmenides with the commentary of Proclus, Republic, Symposium	
Codex Parisinus gr. 1813	13th century		G		Phaedo, Alcibiades II, Hipparchus, Phaedrus, Epigrams, Charmides, Laches	
Codex Parisinus gr. 2953	13th century		W		Gorgias	
Codex Vaticanus gr. 61	13th century		𝔪		Republic, Gorgias, Phaedrus	
Codex Venetus Marcianus App. gr. IV, 54	13th century	G	Λ		Tetralogies I-III	
Codex Vaticanus gr. 225	13th century or later		Δ		Tetralogy I, Gorgias, Meno, Tetralogy II-IV	
Codex Vaticanus gr. 226	13th century or later		Θ		Tetralogy V.1-VI.2, Timaeus, Tetralogy VII, Appendix beginning with On Justice, Clitophon, Republic	
Codex Parisinus gr. 2998	13th-14th centuries		Y		Timaeus	
Codex Vaticanus gr. 1031	13th-14th centuries				Laws, Epinomis, Axiochus, On Justice, On Virtue, Demodocus, Sisyphus, Halcyon, Eryxias, Epigrams, Letters	
Codex Ambrosianus D 56 Sup	14th century		r		Euthyphro, Apology, Phaedo, Statesman, Parmenides, Symposium, Charmides, Protagoras, Gorgias, Meno, Menexenus, Axiochus	
Codex Angelicus 107 (C.1.4)	14th century		u		Tetralogies I-IX, Appendix, Timaeus Locrus, Golden Verses	
Codex Coislinianus 155	14th century		Γ		Tetralogies I.1-VIII.1	
Codex Cesena Plut. 28.4	14th century	M			First seven tetralogies, appendix beginning with On Justice, Cleitophon, Timaeus Locrus, Timaeus, Critias, Minos, Golden Verses, Republic	Prefaced by Albinus, Diogenes Laertius' Life of Plato
Codex Laurentianus plut. Conv Soppr gr. 54	14th century				Tetralogies I.1-V.2	Charmides is placed out of typical order after Alcibiades I
Codex Laurentianus plut. Conv Soppr gr. 78	14th century				Euthyphro, Apology, Crito, Axiochus, On Justice, On Virtue, Demodocus, Sisyphus, Parmenides, Phaedrus	Phaedrus and Parmenides contain commentaries of Proclus and Hermias
Codex Laurentianus plut. Conv Soppr gr. 103	14th century				Euthyphro, Crito, Apology, Timaeus Locrus, Parmenides, Phaedrus	Phaedrus and Parmenides contain commentaries of Proclus and Hermias
Codex Laurentianus Plut. 59.1	14th century		z		Tetralogies I-III, Golden Verses, Timaeus Locrus, Plutarch's On the Generation of the Soul, Timaeus, IV-VII, Appendix beginning with On Justice, VII-IX omitting Timaeus, Epigrams	Prefaced by Life of Plato, Albinus, Theon of Smyrna, Alcinous, Plutarch's De Musica
Codex Laurentianus plut. 60.6	14th century				Phaedo, Gorgias	
Codex Laurentianus plut. 80.19	14th century				Republic, Timaeus	
Codex Laurentianus plut. 85.12	14th century				Gorgias, Cratylus, Euthyphro Apology, Crito, Phaedo, Phaedrus, Menexenus, Alcibiades I, Alcibiades II, Erastes, Lysis	
Codex Laurentianus plut. 87.17	14th century				Euthyphro, Apology	
Codex Parisinus gr. 1040	14th century		b		Letters, Epigrams	
Codex Parisinus gr. 1811	14th century		E		Tetralogies II.1-V.2, VI.3-VII.4, I, V.2-VI.2	
Codex Parisinus gr. 1812	14th century		F		Tetralogies II.1-V.2, VI.3-VII.4, Timaeus	Ion 535e3-538e4 is missing
Codex Parisinus gr. 2010	14th century		S		Apology, Euthyphro, Crito, Axiochus, Timaeus	
Codex Parisinus gr. 2011	14th century		T		Euthyphro, Apology, Phaedrus	
Codex Parisinus gr. 3012	14th century		a		Apology	
Codex Vaticanus gr. 227	14th century		𝔫		Theaetetus, Sophist, Statesman, Parmenides, Philebus, Symposium, Phaedrus	Phaedrus cuts off at 254d4, an additional copy of 253a6-254d4 is placed at the beginning
Codex Vaticanus gr. 228	14th century		𝔬		Euthyphro Apology, Crito, Phaedo, Theaetetus, Sophist, Statesman, Timaeus, Critias, Menexenus, Phaedrus, Alcibiades I, Hippias I, Hippias II, Timaeus Locrus, Phaedo, Euthyphro	
Codex Vaticanus gr. 229	14th century		𝔭		Euthyphro Apology, Crito, Phaedrus, Parmenides, Timaeus Locrus, Republic, Symposium, Phaedo, Gorgias	
Codex Vaticanus gr. 1029	14th century	V	𝔯		Tetralogies I-IX followed by the appendix	works in IV-VII are in a highly unconventional order
Codex Venetus Marcianus 188	14th century				Laws, Epinomis, Demodocus, Sisyphus, Halcyon, Eryxias, Epigrams, Letters	
Codex Venetus Marcianus 189	14th century	S	Σ			
Codex Vindobonensis phil. gr. 21	14th century	Y	Υ			
Codex Vindobonensis sup. gr. 39	14th century	F			Tetralogies VI.3-IX.1	
Codex Vindobonensis Phil 109	14th century or later		Φ		Apology, Crito, Phaedo, Axiochus, Halcyon, Menexenus, Phaedrus, Gorgias, Republic, Timaeus Locrus, Letters, Epigrams	Letters in order: 1-7, 9, 10, 13
Codex Antverpiensis 11360	14th-15th centuries		k			
Codex Antverpiensis 11361	14th-15th centuries		k			
Codex Antverpiensis 11362	14th-15th centuries		k			
Codex Antverpiensis 11363	14th-15th centuries		k			
Codex Ambrosianus D 71 Sup	15th century		s		Parmenides, Timaeus, Phaedo	
Codex Ambrosianus E 90 Sup	15th century		t		Republic	
Codex Florentinus Ricardianus 65	15th century		𝔤		Letters, Epigrams, Timaeus Locrus, Plutarch's On the Generation of the Soul, Timaeus, Phaedrus, Euthyphro, Apology, Crito, Cratylus, Theaetetus, Sophist	Letters 2-13
Codex Florentinus Ricardianus 67	15th century		𝔥		Laws	
Codex Laurentianus plut. Conv Soppr gr. 180	15th century				Timaeus Locrus, Alcibiades I, Alcibiades II, Hipparchus, Erastes, Theages, Charmides, Laches, Lysis, Euthydemus, Protagoras, Gorgias, Meno, Critias, Minos, Laws, Epinomis, Letters, Epigrams	
Codex Laurentianus plut. 4.33	15th century				Menexenus, Timaeus Locrus	
Codex Laurentianus plut. 28.29	15th century				Epigrams, Menexenus, Axiochus, Timaeus Locrus	
Codex Laurentianus plut. 57.12	15th century				Letters	In order 2a, 2b, 1, 2, 4, 5, 9, 10
Codex Laurentianus plut. 57.45	15th century				Letters	In order 2a, 2b, 1, 2, 4, 5, 9, 10
Codex Laurentianus plut. 59.5	15th century				Letters	
Codex Laurentianus plut. 59.47	15th century				Menexenus	
Codex Laurentianus plut. 69.25	15th century				Gorgias	
Codex Laurentianus plut. 80.7	15th century				Republic, Parmenides	
Codex Laurentianus plut. 80.17	15th century	L			Laws, Epinomis, Axiochus, On Justice, On Virtue, Demodocus, Sisyphus, Halcyon, Eryxias, Epigrams, Letters	
Codex Laurentianus plut. 80.27	15th century				Hipparchus	
Codex Laurentianus plut. 85.7	15th century	b			Tetralogies VI.3-VII.4	
Codex Laurentianus plut. 85.9	15th century	c	𝔠		Tetralogies I-VII, Appendix beginning with On Justice, Tetralogies VIII-IX, Epigrams	Timaeus Locrus and Plutarch's On the Generation of the Soul are inserted between Republic and Timaeus
Codex Laurentianus plut. 85.14	15th century				Timaeus, Republic, Symposium, Alcibiades II, Hipparchus, Erastes, Meno	
Codex Laurentianus plut. 89.78	15th century				Gorgias, Euthyphro, Crito	
Codex Monacensis 237	15th century		q		Epigrams, Republic, Timaeus, Timaeus Locrus	
Codex Monacensis 490	15th century				Parmenides, Timaeus, Menexenus, Meno, Laws, Republic	Extracts only for first four dialogues
Codex Mutinensis gr. 129	15th century				Parmenides	
Codex Palatinus 103	15th century				Euthyphro	fragment, only contains 3a1-b6
Codex Palatinus 175	15th century	f	𝔢		Timaeus, Tetralogies IV.1-VI.2, Critias	
Codex Palatinus 177	15th century	f	𝔣		Minos, Laws, Epinomis	
Codex Palatinus 290	15th century				Alcibiades I, Alcibiades II, Crito	Prefaced by Hesiod's Works and Days
Codex Parisinus gr. 1001	15th century		L		Phaedo	
Codex Parisinus gr. 1642	15th century		K		Republic, Symposium, Minos, Epigrams	
Codex Parisinus gr. 1739	15th century		c		Letters	321c3-322a2
Codex Parisinus gr. 1760	15th century		d		Letters	In the order 2a, 2b, 7a, 7b, 1, 2, 4, 5, 10
Codex Parisinus gr. 1809	15th century		C		First seven tetralogies, appendix beginning with On Justice, Timaeus Locrus, Clitophon	
Codex Parisinus gr. 2012	15th century		e		Letters	
Codex Parisinus gr. 2755	15th century		f		Letters	In the order 2a, 2b, 1, 4, 5, 9, 10
Codex Parisinus gr. 2900	15th century		g			
Codex Parisinus gr. 3044	15th century		h		Letters	In the order 2a, 2b, 1, 2, 4, 5, 9, 10
Codex Parisinus gr. 2110	15th century		V		Axiochus, Gorgias	
Codex Vaticanus gr. 1030	15th century		𝔰		Tetralogies II.1-V.2, VI.3-VII.4, I, V.2-VI.2	
Codex Vaticanus gr. 1353	15th century		n		Letters	In order 1, 2, 4, 5, 9, 10, 3, 13, 6, 11
Codex Vaticanus gr. 1461	15th century		o		Letters	
Codex Vaticanus Urbinas 32	15th century		𝔩		On Virtue, Demodocus, Sisyphus, Halcyon, Eryxias, Clitophon, Hippias I, Hippias II, Theages, Laches, Lysis, Euthydemus	
Codex Venetus Marcianus gr. 184	15th century	E	Ξ			
Codex Venetus Marcianus 187	15th century				Republic, Timaeus, Timaeus Locrus, Plutarch's On the Generation of the Soul, Critias, Minos, Laws, Epinomis, Letters	
Codex Vindobonensis Sup Phil 20	15th century				Laws, Epinomis, Letters, Epigrams, On Justice, On Virtue, Demodocus, Sisyphus, Halcyon, Eryxias, Axiochus	
Codex Vossianus gr. 74	15th century				Minos, Laws, Epinomis	
Codex Zittaviensis gr. 1	15th century				Euthyphro Apology, Crito, Phaedo, Theaetetus, Sophist, Statesman, Parmenides, Gorgias, Meno, Hippias I, Symposium, Timaeus, Alcibiades I, Alcibiades II, Axiochus, On Justice, On Virtue, Demodocus, Sisyphus, Halcyon	
Codex Vaticanus gr. 895	15th century or later		l		Cratylus	
Codex Vaticanus gr. 896	15th century or later		m		Cratylus	
Codex Angelicus 101 (C.1.7)	15th-16th centuries		v		Gorgias, Meno, Critias, Minos, Republic, Hippias I, Hippias II, Phaedrus, Laws, Alcibiades II	Followed by the works of Albinus, Theon of Smyrna, Alcinous
Codex Laurentianus Grec. 56.3	15th-16th centuries				Letters	In order 2a, 2b, 9
Codex Vaticanus Urbinas 31	15th-16th centuries		𝔨		Clitophon, Republic, Timaeus Locrus, Laches, Lysis, Euthydemus, Protagoras	

=== 16th and 17th centuries ===
Name	Date	Online	Content	Notes
Codex Angelicus 80 (C.1.11)	16th century		Plutarch's On the Generation of the Soul, Timaeus Locrus, Epinomis	
Codex Parisinus gr. 1814	16th century		Euthyphro, Apology, Crito, Phaedo, Cratylus, Theaetetus, Sophist, Statesman, Parmenides, Philebus, Phaedrus, Alcibiades I	
Codex Parisinus gr. 1815	16th century		Gorgias, Timaeus Locrus, Cratylus, Parmenides, Phaedo	
Codex Parisinus gr. 1825	16th century		Phaedrus with running commentary by Hermias	
Codex Parisinus gr. 1826	16th century		Phaedrus with running commentary by Hermias	
Codex Parisinus gr. 1827	16th century		Phaedrus with running commentary by Hermias	
Codex Parisinus gr. 1835	16th century		Parmenides (126a-142b) with running commentary by Proclus, commentary of Damascius, Parmenides (142b-end)	
Codex Parisinus gr. 1836	16th century		Parmenides (126a-142b) with running commentary by Proclus, followed by commentary of Damascius	
Codex Parisinus gr. 2017	16th century		Alcibiades I with running commentary by Proclus	103a-116b, 107c-108c missing
Codex Parisinus gr. 2992	16th century		Cratylus	
Codex Parisinus gr. 3009	16th century		Menexenus, Epinomis, Axiochus, On Justice, On Virtue, Demodocus, Sisyphus, Halcyon, Eryxias, Epigrams, Letters	Letters in order 1, 2, 13, 3-6, 9-12
Codex Parisinus gr. 3052	16th century		Letters, Epigrams	Letters in order 2a, 2b, 7, 9, 12
Codex Vindobonensis Phil 80	16th century		Euthyphro, Apology, Crito, Phaedo, Theaetetus, Sophist, Statesman, Phaedrus, Parmenides	
Codex Urbinas gr. 28	17th century		Euthyphro, Apology, Crito, Phaedo, Theaetetus, Sophist, Statesman, Parmenides, Symposium	
Codex Urbinas gr. 29	17th century		Alcibiades I, Alcibiades II, Hipparchus, Erastes, Charmides, Gorgias, Ion, Menexenus, Timaeus, Critias, Timaeus Locrus, On Virtue, Demodocus, Letters	
Codex Urbinas gr. 30	17th century		Minos, Laws, Epinomis	

== Papyri ==
=== Oxyrhynchus Papyri ===
Name	Date	Content	Institution
P.Oxy.XXXIII 2662	100 BC-100 AD	Meno 92E-93B	Papyrology Rooms, Sackler Library, Oxford
P.Oxy.LII 3667	200-300 AD	Alcibiades II 142 B-143 C	Papyrology Rooms, Sackler Library, Oxford
P.Oxy.XV 1808	100-200 AD	Republic viii	Papyrology Rooms, Sackler Library, Oxford
P.Oxy.LII 3678	200-300 AD	Philebus18 E-19 A	Papyrology Rooms, Sackler Library, Oxford
P.Oxy.LXXVI 5087	200-300 AD	Laches 180 E, 182 B-C	Papyrology Rooms, Sackler Library, Oxford
P.Oxy.LII 3682	100-200 AD	Theaetetus 209 A-C	Papyrology Rooms, Sackler Library, Oxford
P.Oxy.LXXVI 5078	200-400 AD	Alcibiades I 105 C-D	Papyrology Rooms, Sackler Library, Oxford
P.Oxy.LXXVI 5086	200-300 AD	Laches 179 C-D, 180 A-B	Papyrology Rooms, Sackler Library, Oxford
P.Oxy.XXXIII 2663	100-200 AD	Cratylus 405C	Papyrology Rooms, Sackler Library, Oxford
P.Oxy.LII 3677	100-200 AD	Phaedrus 267 C	Papyrology Rooms, Sackler Library, Oxford
P.Oxy.XV 1809	100-200 AD	Phaedo	Papyrology Rooms, Sackler Library, Oxford
P.Oxy.LII 3676	100-200 AD	Phaedo 107 D-110 A	Papyrology Rooms, Sackler Library, Oxford
P.Oxy.LXXVI 5079	150-200 AD	Alcibiades I 109 A-B, 109 B	Papyrology Rooms, Sackler Library, Oxford
P.Oxy.XLIV 3157	100-200 AD	Republic x	Papyrology Rooms, Sackler Library, Oxford
P.Oxy.LII 3668	100-200 AD	Epistle 2. 310 E-311 A	Papyrology Rooms, Sackler Library, Oxford
P.Oxy.LXXVI 5090	100-200 AD	Politicus 270 D-E	Papyrology Rooms, Sackler Library, Oxford
P.Oxy.LII 3672	200-300 AD	Laws 6. 751 A-C	Papyrology Rooms, Sackler Library, Oxford
P.Oxy.LII 3681	100-300 AD	Theaetetus 198 D-E	Papyrology Rooms, Sackler Library, Oxford
P.Oxy.LII 3666	100-200 AD	Alcibiades I 113 B and 132 A-B	Papyrology Rooms, Sackler Library, Oxford
P.Oxy.LXXVI 5088	100-200 AD	Meno 72 E, 73 A-B	Papyrology Rooms, Sackler Library, Oxford
P.Oxy.LXXVI 5089	100-200 AD	Politicus 257 B-C, 257 D-258 A	Papyrology Rooms, Sackler Library, Oxford
P.Oxy.XLVII 3326	100-200 AD	Republic 8. 545C-546A	Papyrology Rooms, Sackler Library, Oxford
P.Oxy.XLIX 3509	200-300 AD	Republic i 330 a2 - b4	Papyrology Rooms, Sackler Library, Oxford
P.Oxy.LXXVI 5084	100-200 AD	Crito 43 B, 45 B-E, 45 E-46 A, 46 C-D	Papyrology Rooms, Sackler Library, Oxford
P.Oxy.LII 3671	150-200 AD	Laches 179 B-C	Papyrology Rooms, Sackler Library, Oxford
P.Oxy.LII 3670	100-300 AD	Hippias Major 291 D-E	Papyrology Rooms, Sackler Library, Oxford
P.Oxy.XXXVI 2751	150-250 AD	Republic III	Papyrology Rooms, Sackler Library, Oxford
P.Oxy.LII 3680	100-200 AD	Theaetetus 190 E-191 A	Papyrology Rooms, Sackler Library, Oxford
P.Oxy.XVII 2102	150-200 AD	Phaedrus	Papyrology Rooms, Sackler Library, Oxford
P.Oxy.XV 1809	100-200 AD	Phaedo	Papyrology Rooms, Sackler Library, Oxford
P.Oxy.LXXVI 5091	100-300 AD	Politicus 299 E, 300 A-B, 300 C	Papyrology Rooms, Sackler Library, Oxford
P.Oxy.LXXVI 5092	100-200 AD	Politicus 305 D-306 B	Papyrology Rooms, Sackler Library, Oxford
P.Oxy.LII 3674	100-200 AD	Laws 9. 854 C-D	Papyrology Rooms, Sackler Library, Oxford
P.Oxy.LII 3673	150-250 AD	Laws 6. 771 A-D	Papyrology Rooms, Sackler Library, Oxford
P.Oxy.LII 3675	100-200 AD	Laws 9. 865 A-C	Papyrology Rooms, Sackler Library, Oxford
P.Oxy.LII 3669	100-200 AD	Gorgias 491 B, 495 C-E	Papyrology Rooms, Sackler Library, Oxford
P.Oxy.LXXVI 5081	100-300 AD	Charmides 166C, 167A	Papyrology Rooms, Sackler Library, Oxford
P.Oxy.LXXVI 5085	200-300 AD	Euthedemus 286 D, 286 E	Papyrology Rooms, Sackler Library, Oxford
P.Oxy.LII 3679	200-300 AD	Republic 5. 472 E-473 D	Papyrology Rooms, Sackler Library, Oxford
P.Oxy.LXXVI 5082	200-300 AD	Charmides 172 C-D, 173 A-B	Papyrology Rooms, Sackler Library, Oxford
P.Oxy.LXXVI 5083	200-350 AD	Cratylus 423 E	Papyrology Rooms, Sackler Library, Oxford

Additional fragments

- Papyrus Oxyrhynchus 23 — Laws, fragment
- Papyrus Oxyrhynchus 228 — Laches, fragment
- Papyrus Oxyrhynchus 229 — Phaedo, fragment

=== Others ===
These papyrus are listed in Pack 1965, pp. 50, 80–81

Number	Date	Content	Notes
Papyrus 1386	1st to 2nd century AD	Euthyphro 2a-c	
Papyrus 1387	1st to 2nd century AD	Apologia 40b-41c	
Papyrus 1388	3rd century BC	Phaedo 67e-69a, 79c-81d, 82a-84b	
Papyrus 1389	2nd century AD	Phaedo 75a-117	contains lacunae
Papyrus 1390	2nd century AD	Phaedo 102c-103c	
Papyrus 1392	2nd century AD	Phaedo 109cd	
Papyrus 1393	2nd century AD	Theaetetus	Anonymous Commentary on Theaetetus
Papyrus 1394	6th century AD	Theaetetus 143c3, 144d-145a	
Papyrus 1395	3rd century BC	Sophist 223e4-224a2, 224b1-3	Digitised Manuscripts, British Library
Papyrus 1396	2nd century AD	Statesman 257b, 261d-262c	Digitised Manuscripts, British Library
Papyrus 1397	2nd century AD	Statesman 280e-282e	
Papyrus 1398	2nd century AD	Statesman 308e-309b	
Papyrus 1399	3rd century AD	Symposium 200b-223d	
Papyrus 1400	2nd century AD	Phaedrus 227a-230e	
Papyrus 1401	2nd to 3rd century AD	Phaedrus 238c-240d	
Papyrus 1402	2nd century AD	Phaedrus 242d-244e	
Papyrus 1403	2nd to 3rd century AD	Phaedrus 257d	
Papyrus 1404	2nd century AD	Phaedrus 265c-d, Philebus 16d-17a	Commentary on Phaedrus that contains a quote of Philebus
Papyrus 1405	2nd century AD	Phaedrus 266d	
Papyrus 1407	2nd century AD	Alcibiades I 107c	
Papyrus 1408	2nd to 3rd century AD	Laches 181b-182a	Digitised Manuscripts, British Library
Papyrus 1409	3rd century BC	Laches 189d-192a	
Papyrus 1410	2nd century AD	Laches 197a-198a	
Papyrus 1411	3rd century AD	Lysis 208cd	
Papyrus 1412	2nd to 3rd century AD	Euthydemus 301e-302c	
Papyrus 1413	3rd century AD	Protagoras 337-357	
Papyrus 1414	3rd century AD	Gorgias 447bc, 468ad	
Papyrus 1415	2nd century AD	Gorgias 504b-505a	
Papyrus 1416	2nd century AD	Gorgias 507b-508e, 522-526	
Papyrus 1417	2nd century AD	Gorgias 522cd	
Papyrus 2290	3rd century AD	Meno 94c	Quoted in a work on literary criticism
Papyrus 1418	3rd century AD	Republic 406ab	
Papyrus 1419	2nd to 3rd century AD	Republic 422d	
Papyrus 1420	3rd century AD	Republic 485d-486c	
Papyrus 1421	2nd century AD	Republic 546d-547b	
Papyrus 1422	3rd century AD	Republic 607-608	
Papyrus 2120	2nd century AD	Laws 672c, 747d	Cited in a glossary, attributed to Phaedo rather than Laws
Papyrus 1423	3rd century AD	Laws 797a	
Papyrus 1424	3rd century AD	Laws 832e-835e	
Papyrus 1425	3rd century AD	Laws 862-863	
Papyrus 1426	2nd century AD	Timaeus 19c-20a	
Papyrus 2339	1st to 2nd century AD	Timaeus	Anonymous Londinensis
Papyrus 1427	3rd century AD	On Justice 372a	
Papyrus 1428	2nd century BC	On Virtue 376	
Papyrus 1429	4th century AD	Eryxias 405e, Demodocus 380a	

== Other Languages ==
- Nag Hammadi library – Republic 588A–589B, Coptic version
