= Hermocrates (dialogue) =

Hypothetical dialogue

Hermocrates (/hɜːrˈmɒkrəˌtiːz/; Greek: Ἑρμοκράτης, romanized: Hermokrátēs) is a hypothetical dialogue, assumed to be the third part of Plato's late trilogy along with Timaeus and Critias. It is not known exactly how Critias ended, as the ending to the book is currently lost, so historians have not been able to say exactly how Hermocrates would begin. In any case, the people that would have appeared are very likely to be the same as in the former dialogues – Timaeus, Critias, Hermocrates, and Socrates – and the unnamed companion mentioned at the beginning of the Timaeus might have unveiled his identity. The intention of Plato to write this third dialogue becomes evident among others, from the following passage of Critias:

Socrates: Certainly, Critias, we will grant your request [to speak] and we will grant the same by anticipation to Hermocrates, as well as to you and Timaeus.

Hermocrates had only a small share of the conversation in the previous dialogues. Since the Critias recounted the story of the ideal state in ancient Athens of nine thousand years ago – and why it was able to repel the invasion by the imperialist naval power Atlantis – by referring to prehistoric accounts via Solon and the Egyptians, it might have been Hermocrates' task to tell how the imperialist naval power, into which Athens of Plato's lifetime had turned, had suffered a bitter defeat in the Sicilian expedition against Syracuse and eventually in the Peloponnesian War against Sparta – since he was a Syracusan strategos during the time of the Sicilian expedition. The sequence of names of the three participants in these dialogues could also have a significance. The name of Timaeus is derived from the Greek word τιμάω, timaō meaning to pay honor to; the name of Critias is derived from the word κρίσις, krisis meaning judgment; and the name of Hermocrates, means gifted by Hermes, messenger of the gods.

== In popular culture ==
In the video game Indiana Jones and the Fate of Atlantis the Lost Dialogue of Plato is known as the Hermocrates. In the game, the book survived in Arabic translation, and was translated to English by one of the characters, and acts as an important tool for Dr. Jones throughout the game. Its contents, however, are about the location of Atlantis, entry to the city, and notes about its inhabitants and culture.

In the Yu-Gi-Oh! Duel Monsters season 4, one of the three legendary knights of the anime' Atlantis is named Hermos, with the other two named Timaeus and Critias.
