= Traditional economy =

Economic system based on custom and tradition

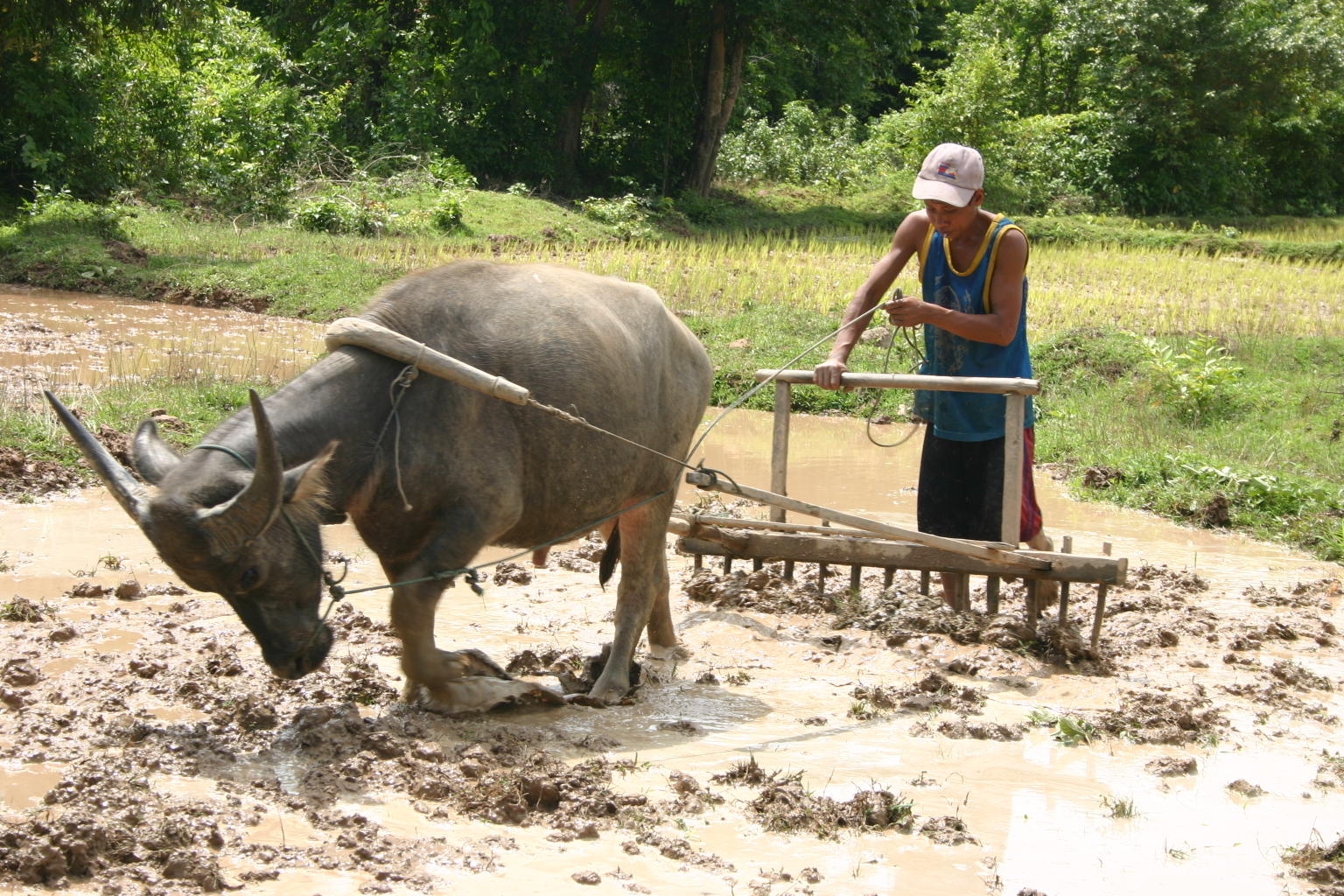
A Laotian farmer plowing with a buffalo.

A traditional economy is a loosely defined term sometimes used for older economic systems in economics and anthropology. It may imply that an economy is not deeply connected to wider regional trade networks; that many or most members engage in subsistence agriculture, possibly being a subsistence economy; that barter is used to a greater frequency than in developed economies; that there is little governmental oversight of the economy; that at least some taxes might be in the form of goods or corvée labor rather than money; or some combination of the above. Aspects of traditional economies often carry forward into the "modern" economies they become, though. It is not uncommon for a traditional economy that heavily centers the role of tribes and families in distributing wealth to continue keeping a large role for them even after connections to outside trade are formed, at least if the original elite manage to keep their status rather than being displaced by an invasion or revolution or the like.

== See also ==
- Agricultural economics
- Ancient economic thought
- Manorialism
