= Papyrus Oxyrhynchus 223 =

Greek papyrus fragment

Papyrus Oxyrhynchus 223 (P. Oxy. 223 or P. Oxy. II 223) is a fragment of Homer's Iliad (E,329-705), written in Homeric Greek. It was discovered in Oxyrhynchus. The manuscript was written on papyrus in the form of a roll. It is dated to the third century AD. Currently it is housed in the Bodleian Library (Ms. Gr. Class. a 8) in Oxford.

== Description ==
The document was written by an unknown copyist. It contains part of the text of the fifth book of the Iliad, from Diomedes' attack on Aphrodite to the point when Hector and Ares face down the Achaians. It is written on the verso side of the Petition of Dionysia. Before it was utilised for the Iliad roll, it had to be patched and strengthened. The original roll was of great length.

The measurements of the fragment are 260 mm × 2,095 mm (10.2 in × 6 ft 10.5 in). The text is written in a bold well formed uncial hand of the square sloping type. The letter xi is formed by three separate strokes (Ξ instead of ξ). It uses accents, breathings, and marks of elision. There are some errors, typical for Homeric papyri of the Roman period.

The text contains corrections as well.

It was discovered by Grenfell and Hunt in 1897 in Oxyrhynchus. The text was published by Grenfell and Hunt in 1899. The editors collated the text of the codex against La Roche's text (R). They noticed errors of itacism (ει for ι). The number of divergences is not high.

== See also ==
- Oxyrhynchus Papyri
- Papyrus Oxyrhynchus 221
- Papyrus Oxyrhynchus 224
