= Papyrus Oxyrhynchus 225 =

Greek papyrus fragment

Papyrus Oxyrhynchus 225 (P. Oxy. 225 or P. Oxy. II 225) is a fragment of Thucydides (II,90-91), written in Greek. It was discovered in Oxyrhynchus. The manuscript was written on papyrus in the form of a roll. It is dated to the first century. Currently it is housed in the British Library (Department of Manuscripts, 784) in London.

== Description ==
The document was written by an unknown copyist. It contains text from the History of the Peloponnesian War (II,90-91) of Thucydides. The measurements of the fragment are 130 by 54 mm. The text is written in a good-sized, and handsome but not very formal uncial hand. According to Grenfell and Hunt it is the same date as Papyrus Oxyrhynchus 16. Textually it is close to the Laurentian codex of Thucydides.

It was discovered by Grenfell and Hunt in 1897 in Oxyrhynchus. The text was published by Grenfell and Hunt in 1899.

== See also ==
- Oxyrhynchus Papyri
- Papyrus Oxyrhynchus 224
- Papyrus Oxyrhynchus 226
