= Papyrus Oxyrhynchus 224 =

Greek papyrus fragment

Papyrus Oxyrhynchus 224 (P. Oxy. 224 or P. Oxy. II 224) is a fragment of the Phoenissae (lines 1017-1043, 1064-1071), a tragedy of Euripides, written in Greek. It was discovered in Oxyrhynchus. The manuscript was written on papyrus in the form of a roll. It is dated to the third century. Currently it is housed in the British Library (Department of Manuscripts, 783) in London.

== Description ==
The document was written by an unknown copyist. The measurements of the fragment are 235 by 215 mm. The text is written in a large, heavy, formal uncial hand. The handwriting is similar to the biblical great uncials. There are stops and a few accents.

It was discovered by Grenfell and Hunt in 1897 in Oxyrhynchus. The text was published by Grenfell and Hunt in 1899.

== See also ==
- Oxyrhynchus Papyri
- Papyrus Oxyrhynchus 223
- Papyrus Oxyrhynchus 225
