= Papyrus Oxyrhynchus 226 =

Greek papyrus fragment

Papyrus Oxyrhynchus 226 (P. Oxy. 226 or P. Oxy. II 226) is a fragment of the Hellenica (VI,5) of Xenophon, written in Greek. It was discovered in Oxyrhynchus. The manuscript was written on papyrus in the form of a roll. It is dated to the first or second century. Currently it is housed at Columbia University in New York City.

== Description ==
The document was written by an unknown copyist. The measurements of the fragment are 140 by 120 mm. The text is written in a medium-sized neat uncial hand. It has only a few, unimportant textual variants.

It was discovered by Grenfell and Hunt in 1897 in Oxyrhynchus. The text was published by Grenfell and Hunt in 1899.

== See also ==
- Oxyrhynchus Papyri
- Papyrus Oxyrhynchus 225
- Papyrus Oxyrhynchus 227
