= Roger Boesche =

American political theorist (1948–2017)

- Born: January 24, 1948; Tulsa, Oklahoma, U.S.
- Died: May 23, 2017 (aged 69); Los Angeles, California, U.S.
- Education: Stanford University
- Occupation: Political theorist
- Employer: Occidental College
- Spouse: Mandy Boesche

Roger Boesche (January 24, 1948 – May 23, 2017) was an American political theorist. He was the Arthur G. Coons Distinguished Professor of the History of ideas at Occidental College.

== Early life ==
Roger Boesche was born on January 24, 1948, in Tulsa, Oklahoma. He graduated from Stanford University, where he earned a PhD in political science.

== Career ==
Boesche taught American and European political thought at Occidental College from 1977 to 2017. He was promoted to an endowed chair: the Arthur G. Coons Distinguished Professor of the History of Ideas. One of his students was President Barack Obama. He served as the president of Occidental College's faculty council from 1990 to 1992, and he won the Loftsgordon Award, the Graham L. Sterling Memorial Award, and the Linda and Todd White Teaching Prize. Boesche also played a role in Occidental College's disinvestment from South Africa.

Boesche was the author of several books, three of which were about Alexis de Tocqueville.

== Personal life ==
Boesche met his future wife, Mandy, at a Vietnam War protest. She later taught at The Waverly School and Westridge School. They resided in Eagle Rock, Los Angeles, and they had a daughter, Kelsey, who became an opera singer.

== Death ==
Boesche died on May 23, 2017, in Los Angeles, California.

== Works ==
- Alexis de Tocqueville: Selected Letters on Politics and Society (1985)
- The Strange Liberalism of Alexis de Tocqueville (1987)
- Theories of Tyranny: From Plato to Arendt (1996)
- The First Great Political Realist: Kautilya and His Arthashastra (2002)
- Tocqueville's Road Map: Methodology, Liberalism, Revolution, and Despotism (2006)
