= Papyrus Oxyrhynchus 229 =

Manuscript fragment

Papyrus Oxyrhynchus 229 (P. Oxy. 229 or P. Oxy. II 229) is a fragment of the Phaedo, a dialogue by Plato, written in Greek. It was discovered in Oxyrhynchus. The manuscript was written on papyrus in the form of a roll. It is dated to the second or third century. Currently it is housed in the British Library (Department of Manuscripts, 786) in London.

== Description ==
The document was written by an unknown copyist. It contains part of the text of the Phaedo (109 C, D). The measurements of the fragment are 170 by 49 mm. The text is written in a small cramped uncial hand. It uses breathing and accents. There are two lines at the top in a cursive hand, which appear to be a heading. It does not have any remarkable textual variations. The occasional corrections were inserted after the writing, possibly by the original scribe.

It was discovered by Grenfell and Hunt in 1897 in Oxyrhynchus. The text was published by Grenfell and Hunt in 1899.

== See also ==
- Oxyrhynchus Papyri
- Papyrus Oxyrhynchus 228
- Papyrus Oxyrhynchus 230
