= Papyrus Oxyrhynchus 227 =

Greek papyrus fragment

Papyrus Oxyrhynchus 227 (P. Oxy. 227 or P. Oxy. II 227) is a fragment of the Oeconomicus of Xenophon, written in Greek. It was discovered in Oxyrhynchus. Dated to the first century, the manuscript was written on papyrus in the form of a roll. Currently, it is housed in the British Library (Department of Manuscripts, 785) in London.

== Description ==
The document was written by an unknown copyist. It contains the text of the Oeconomicus (VIII,17 – IX,2) of Xenophon. The measurements of the fragment are 260 mm by 120 mm. The text is written in a round uncial hand resembling that of the British Library Papyrus CCLXXI, which contains the third book of the Odyssey. Textually, it is corrupt in some places, although it also sometimes preserves good readings. A few corrections were made by a second hand, mostly the insertion of the iota adscript.

It was discovered by Grenfell and Hunt in 1897 in Oxyrhynchus. The text was published by Grenfell and Hunt in 1899.

== See also ==
- Oxyrhynchus Papyri
- Papyrus Oxyrhynchus 226
- Papyrus Oxyrhynchus 228
