= Timaeus (dialogue) =

Dialogue by Plato

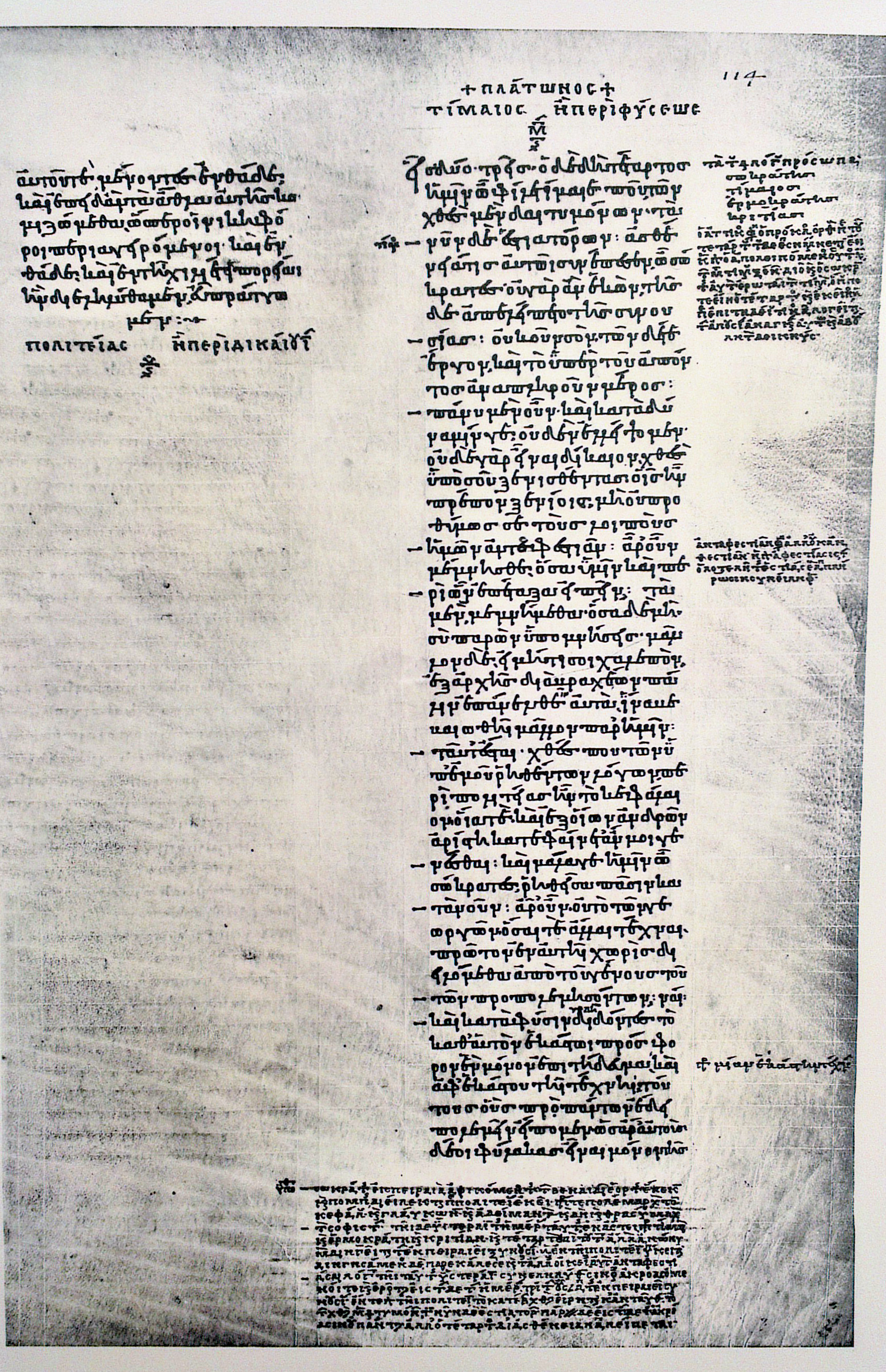
Greek manuscript of Timaeus (Codex Parisinus graecus 1807), c. AD 900

Timaeus (/taɪˈmiːəs/; Ancient Greek: Τίμαιος, romanized: Timaios, pronounced [tǐːmai̯os]), written c. 360 BC, is one of Plato's dialogues, mostly in the form of long speeches by Timaeus and Critias. It is perhaps most noteworthy for its argument for the existence of a "craftsman" (Demiurge, Gk. demiourgos) by Timaeus. The speech goes on to present cosmological speculations about a World Soul, the creation of the earth and the heavenly spheres, the created gods, man, and finally animals. The dialogue begins with a shorter speech by Critias, unrelated to the later cosmological themes, about the myth of Atlantis and an earlier golden age of Athens.

The dramatic setting of the Timaeus is unusual for Plato's dialogues. Participants in the dialogue include Socrates, Timaeus, Hermocrates, and Critias. Socrates praises his three interlocutors as distinguished intellectuals. At the beginning of the dialogue, the absence of another, unnamed participant, who was present on the day before, is bemoaned. Timaeus gives the first long speech of the day, and occupies most of the eponymous work. The dialogue Critias follows it, as in a series, recounting the second long speech of the day. Scholars frequently speculate that Plato planned a third work, a Hermocrates. Since we have the Critias only in an unfinished form, it is thought that Plato never finished such a three-part work.

== Introduction ==
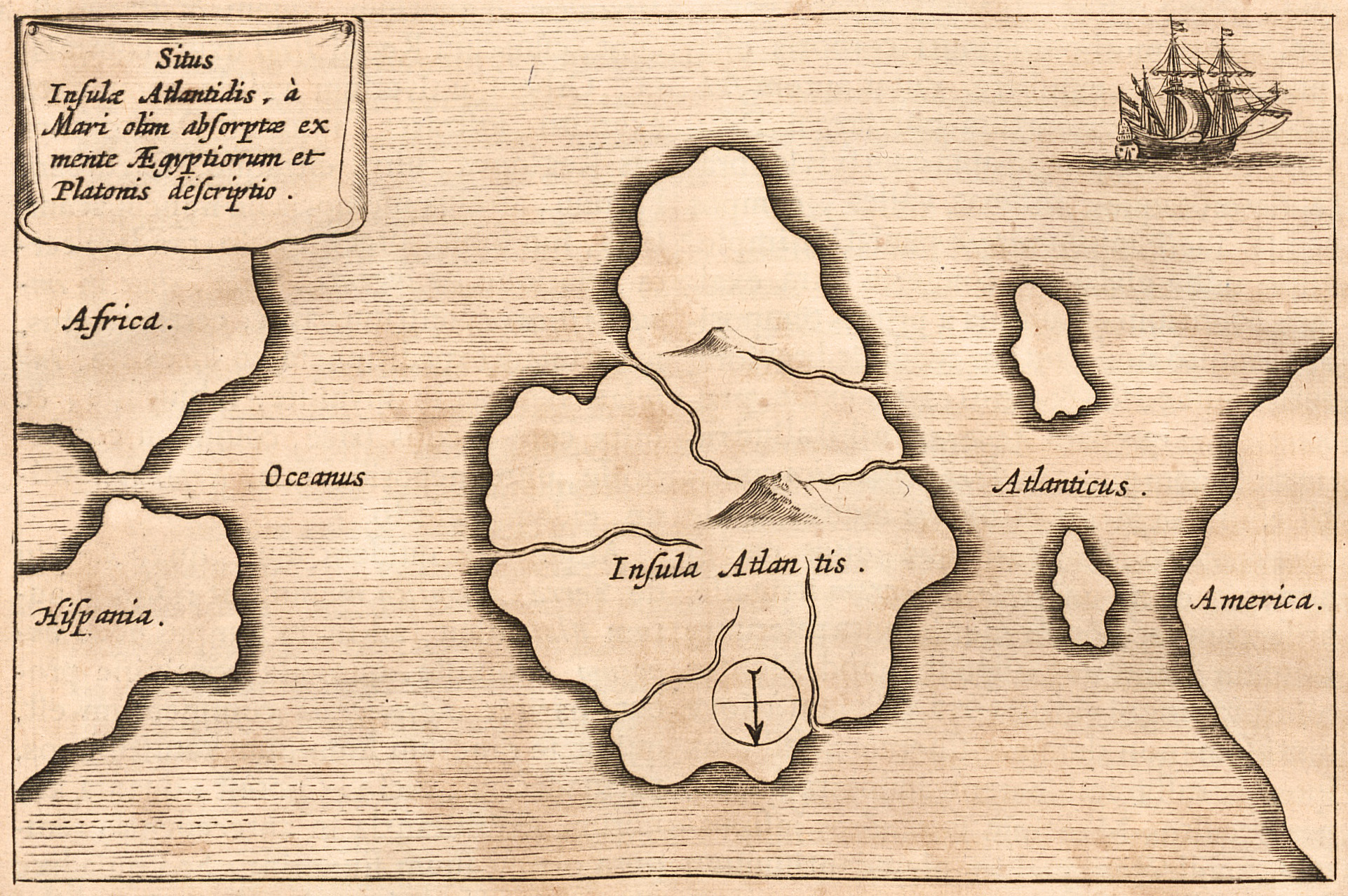
Athanasius Kircher's map of Atlantis from Mundus Subterraneus ("The Underearth World") (1669), drawn with south at the top.

The dialogue takes place the day after Socrates describes his ideal state. In Plato's works, such a discussion occurs in the Republic. Socrates feels that his description of the ideal state was insufficient for the purposes of entertainment, stating "I would be glad to hear some account of it engaging in transactions with other states" (19b).

Hermocrates wishes to oblige Socrates and mentions that Critias knows of an apt account (20b) to do so. Critias proceeds to tell the story of Solon's journey to Egypt where he hears the story of Atlantis, and how Athens used to be an ideal state that subsequently waged war against Atlantis (25a). Critias believes he is getting ahead of himself, and mentions that Timaeus will tell part of the account from the origin of the universe to man.

Critias cites the Egyptian priest in Sais on long-term factors regarding the fate of mankind:

There have been, and will be again, many destructions of mankind arising out of many causes; the greatest have been brought about by the agencies of fire and water, and other lesser ones by innumerable other causes. There is a story that even you [Greeks] have preserved, that once upon a time, Phaethon, the son of Helios, having yoked the steeds in his father's chariot, because he was not able to drive them in the path of his father, burnt up all that was upon the earth, and was himself destroyed by a thunderbolt. Now this has the form of a myth, but really signifies a declination of the bodies moving in the heavens around the earth, and a great conflagration of things upon the earth, which recurs after long intervals.

The history of Atlantis is postponed to Critias. The main content of the dialogue, the exposition by Timaeus, follows.

== Synopsis of Timaeus's account ==
=== Nature of the physical world ===
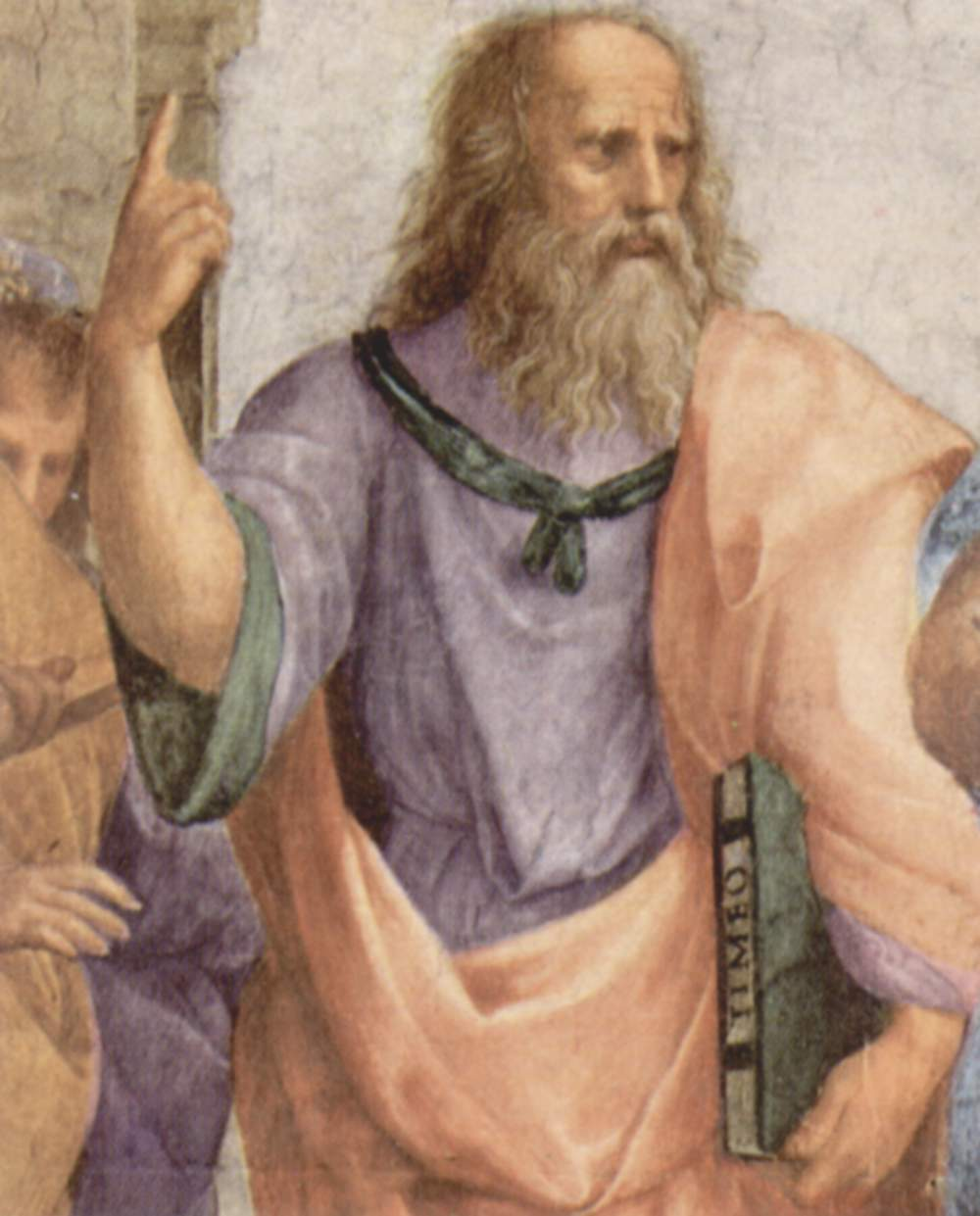
Plato is depicted in Raphael's The School of Athens fresco in the Vatican, anachronistically carrying a bound copy of Timaeus.

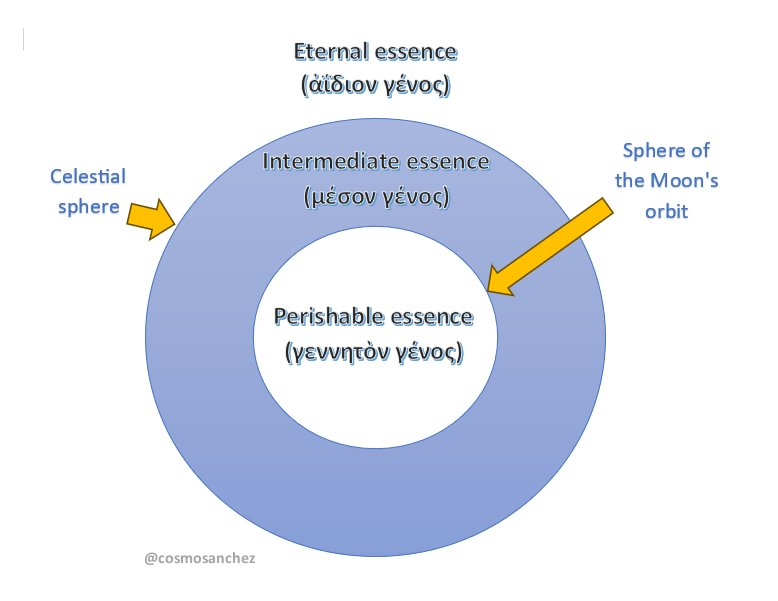
The Eternal Essence corresponds to the intelligible world, The Perishable Essence is the realm of sensory experience, where all things are subject to generation and decay. The Intermediate Essence acts as a bridge between these two, harmonizing the cosmos through the World Soul (ψυχὴ τοῦ κόσμου).

Timaeus opens with a distinction between the physical and eternal world. The physical world is one that changes and perishes; therefore it is the object of opinion and unreasoned sensation. The eternal world never changes; therefore it is apprehended by reason (28a).

The speeches on the two worlds are conditioned by the distinct nature of their objects. Indeed, "a description of what is changeless, fixed and clearly intelligible will be changeless and fixed," (29b), while a description of what changes and is likely, will also change and remain likely. "As being is to becoming, so is truth to belief" (29c). Therefore, in a description of the physical world, one "should not look for anything more than a likely story" (29d).

Timaeus suggests that since nothing "becomes or changes" without cause, then the cause of the universe must be a demiurge or a god, a figure Timaeus refers to as the father and maker of the universe. Since the universe is fair, the demiurge must have looked to the eternal model to make it, and not to the perishable one (29a). Hence, using the eternal and perfect world of "forms" or ideals as a template, he set about creating our world, which formerly existed in a state of disorder.

=== Creation of the universe ===
Timaeus continues with an explanation of the creation of the universe, which he ascribes to the handiwork of a divine craftsman. The demiurge, being good, wanted as much good as was present in the world. The demiurge is said to bring order out of substance by imitating an unchanging and eternal model (paradigm). Ananke, often translated as 'Necessity', was the only other co-existent element or presence in Plato's cosmogony. Later Platonists clarified that the eternal model existed in the mind of the demiurge.

=== Properties of the universe ===
Timaeus describes the substance as a lack of homogeneity or balance, in which the four elements (earth, air, fire and water) are shapeless, mixed and in constant motion. Considering that order is favourable over disorder, the essential act of the creator was to bring order and clarity to this substance. Therefore, all properties of the world are to be explained by the demiurge's choice of what is fair and good; or, the idea of a dichotomy between good and evil.

First, the world is a living creature. Since the unintelligent creatures are in their appearance less fair than intelligent creatures, and since intelligence needs to be settled in a soul, the demiurge "put intelligence in soul, and soul in body" in order to make a living and intelligent whole. "Wherefore, using the language of probability, we may say that the world became a living creature truly endowed with soul and intelligence by the providence of God" (30a–b).

Then, since the part is imperfect compared to the whole, the world had to be one and only. Therefore, the demiurge did not create several worlds, but a single unique world (31b). Additionally, because the demiurge wanted his creation to perfectly imitate the Eternal "One" (the source of all other emanations), there was no need to create more than one world.

The creator decided to make the perceptible body of the universe by four elements, in order to render it proportioned. In addition to fire and earth, which make bodies visible and solid, a third element was required as a mean: "two things cannot be rightly put together without a third; there must be some bond of union between them". Moreover, since the world is not a surface but a solid, a fourth mean was needed to reach harmony: therefore, the creator placed water and air between fire and earth. "And for these reasons, and out of such elements which are in number four, the body of the world was created, and it was harmonised by proportion" (31–33).

As for the figure, the demiurge created the world in the geometric form of a globe. Indeed, the round figure is the most perfect one, because it comprehends or averages all the other figures and is the most omnimorphic: "he [the demiurge] considered that the like is infinitely fairer than the unlike" (33b).

The creator assigned a rotatory or circular movement to the world, which is the "most appropriate to mind and intelligence" on account of its being the most uniform (34a).

Finally, he created the soul of the world, placed that soul in the center of the world's body and diffused it in every direction. Having thus been created as a perfect, self-sufficient and intelligent being, the world is a god (34b).

=== The creation of the world-soul ===
Timaeus explains how the soul of the world was created (Plato's following discussion is obscure, and almost certainly intended to be read in light of the Sophist). The demiurge combined three elements: two varieties of Sameness (one indivisible and another divisible), two varieties of Difference (again, one indivisible and another divisible), and two types of Being (or Existence, once more, one indivisible and another divisible). From this, three compound substances emerged: intermediate (or mixed) Being, intermediate Sameness, and intermediate Difference. Compounding these three intermediate substances together, one final substance resulted: the world-soul. He then divided following precise mathematical proportions, cutting the compound lengthways, fixed the resulting two bands in their middle, like in the letter chi (Χ) and connected them at their ends, to have two crossing circles. The demiurge imparted on them a circular movement on their axis: the outer circle was assigned Sameness and turned horizontally to the right, while the inner circle was assigned to Difference and turned diagonally and to the left (34c–36c).

The demiurge gave the primacy to the motion of Sameness and left it undivided; but he divided the motion of Difference in six parts, to have seven unequal circles. He prescribed these circles to move in opposite directions, three of them with equal speeds, the others with unequal speeds, but always in proportion. These circles are the orbits of the heavenly bodies: the three moving at equal speeds are the Sun, Venus and Mercury, while the four moving at unequal speeds are the Moon, Mars, Jupiter and Saturn (36c–d). The complicated pattern of these movements is bound to be repeated again after a period called a 'complete' or 'perfect' year (39d).

Then, the demiurge connected the body and the soul of the universe: he diffused the soul from the center of the body to its extremities in every direction, allowing the invisible soul to envelop the visible body. The soul began to rotate and this was the beginning of its eternal and rational life (36e).

Therefore, having been composed by Sameness, Difference and Existence (their mean), and formed in right proportions, the soul declares the sameness or difference of every object it meets: when it is a sensible object, the inner circle of the Diverse transmits its movement to the soul, whereby opinions arise, but when it is an intellectual object, the circle of the Same turns perfectly round and true knowledge arises (37a–c).

The world as a whole, the planets, and the stars are living, visible gods (39e) that have an important role in creating human beings and regulating their moral life (41d).

=== The elements ===
Timaeus claims that the minute particle of each element had a special geometric shape: tetrahedron (fire), octahedron (air), icosahedron (water), and cube (earth).

Tetrahedron (fire)

Octahedron (air)

Icosahedron (water)

Cube (earth)

Dodecahedron – the fifth element

Timaeus makes conjectures on the composition of the four elements which some ancient Greeks thought constituted the physical universe: earth, water, air, and fire. Timaeus links each element to a certain Platonic solid: earth to a cube, air to an octahedron, water to an icosahedron, and fire to a tetrahedron. Each perfect polyhedron would be in turn composed of triangular faces of 30-60-90 and 45-45-90 triangles. The faces of each element could be broken down into its component right-angled triangles, either isosceles or scalene, which could then be put together to form all physical matter. Particular characteristics of matter, such as water's capacity to extinguish fire, was related to the shape and size of constituent triangles. The fifth element (i.e. Platonic solid) was the dodecahedron, whose faces are not triangular, which was taken to represent the shape of the Universe as a whole, possibly because - of all the elements - it most approximates a sphere, which Timaeus noted as the shape into which God formed the Universe.

The extensive final part of the dialogue addresses the creation of humans, including the soul, anatomy, perception, and transmigration of the soul. Plato discusses the creation of the body, as well as causes of bodily and psychic diseases.

== Sources and influences ==
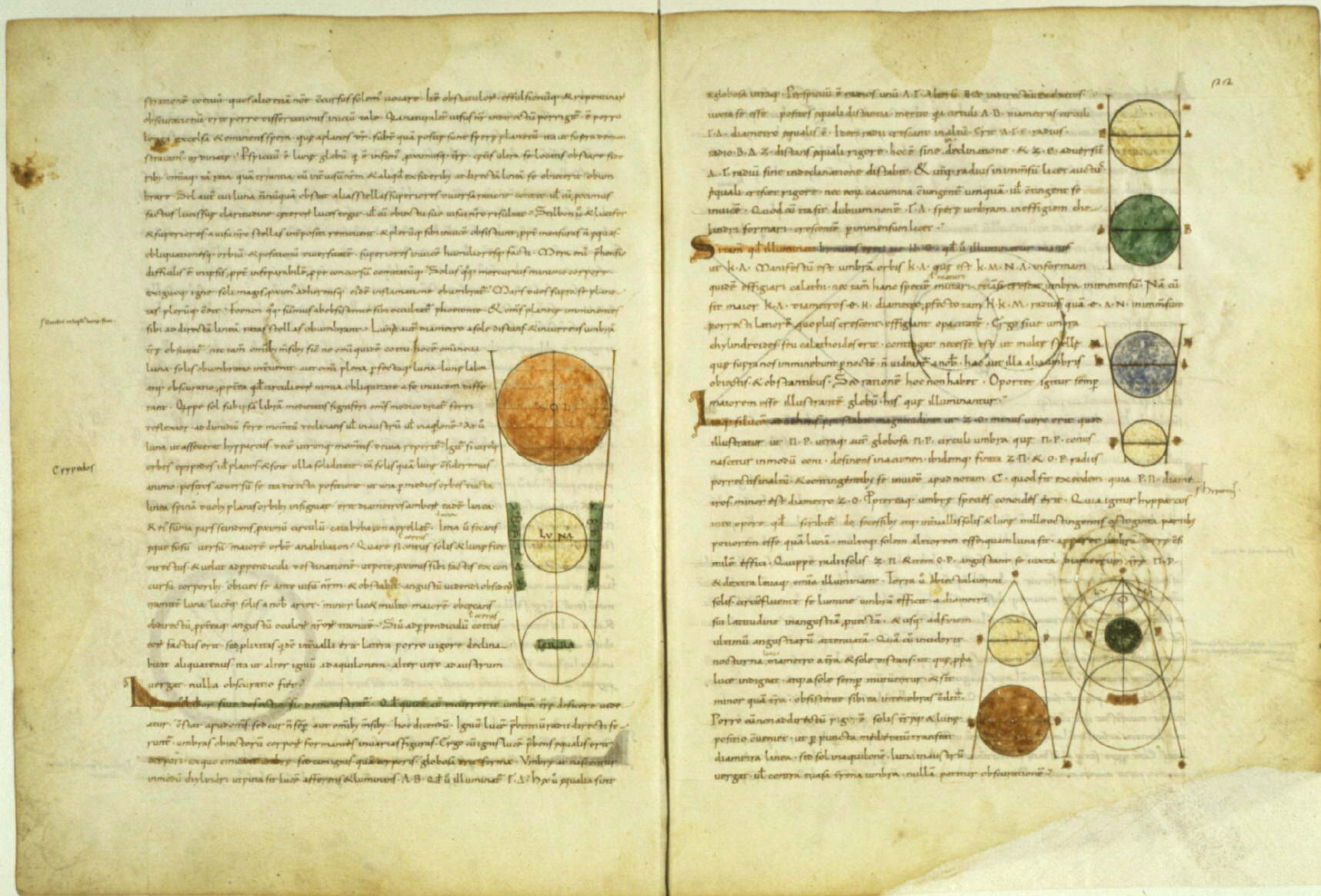
Medieval manuscript of Calcidius's Latin Timaeus translation

It has been suggested from some traditions—Diogenes Laertius (VIII 85) from Hermippus of Smyrna (3rd century BC) and Timon of Phlius (c. 320 – c. 235 BC)—that Timaeus was influenced by a book about Pythagoras, written by Philolaus, although modern Plato specialists generally find this speculation unsubstantiated.

The Timaeus was translated into Latin first by Marcus Tullius Cicero around 45 BC (sections 27d–47b), and later by Calcidius in the 4th century AD (up to section 53c). Cicero's fragmentary translation was highly influential in late antiquity, especially on Latin-speaking Church Fathers such as Saint Augustine who did not appear to have access to the original Greek dialogue. The manuscript production and preservation of Cicero's Timaeus (among many other Latin philosophical works) is largely due to the works of monastic scholars, especially at Corbie in North-East France during the Carolingian Period.

Calcidius's more extensive translation of the Timaeus had a strong influence on medieval Neoplatonic cosmology and was commented on particularly by 12th-century Christian philosophers of the Chartres School, such as Thierry of Chartres and William of Conches, who, interpreting it in the light of the Christian faith, understood the dialogue to refer to a creatio ex nihilo. Calcidius himself never explicitly linked the Platonic creation account in the Timaeus with the Old Testament's own in Genesis in his commentary on the dialogue.

Although there is no evidence that any of Plato's works were translated into Arabic during the medieval era, the dialogue was still highly influential in Arabic-speaking regions beginning in the 10th century AD, albeit indirectly, via a translation by the Syrian Nestorian Christian Hunayn ibn Ishaq (809 – 873 AD) of a synopsis of the work by Galen, which is still extant. The Catalogue (fihrist) of Ibn al-Nadīm provides some evidence for an early translation by Ibn al-Bitriq (Al-Kindī's circle) of this synopsis.

During much of the Middle Ages in the Latin-speaking West the Timaeus was the sole work of Plato which was typically available in monastic libraries. In the fourteenth century, Petrarch (1304-1374) noted having difficulty locating a copy.

In his introduction to Plato's Dialogues, 19th-century translator Benjamin Jowett comments, "Of all the writings of Plato, the Timaeus is the most obscure and repulsive to the modern reader."

== See also ==
- Creation myth
- Critias (dialogue)
- Esoteric cosmology
- Gottfried Wilhelm Leibniz
- Johannes Kepler
- Khôra
- Philebus
- Plotinus
- Proclus
- Religious cosmology
- Sophist
- Statesman
- Teleological argument
