= Golden Verses =

Ancient Greek moral exhortations

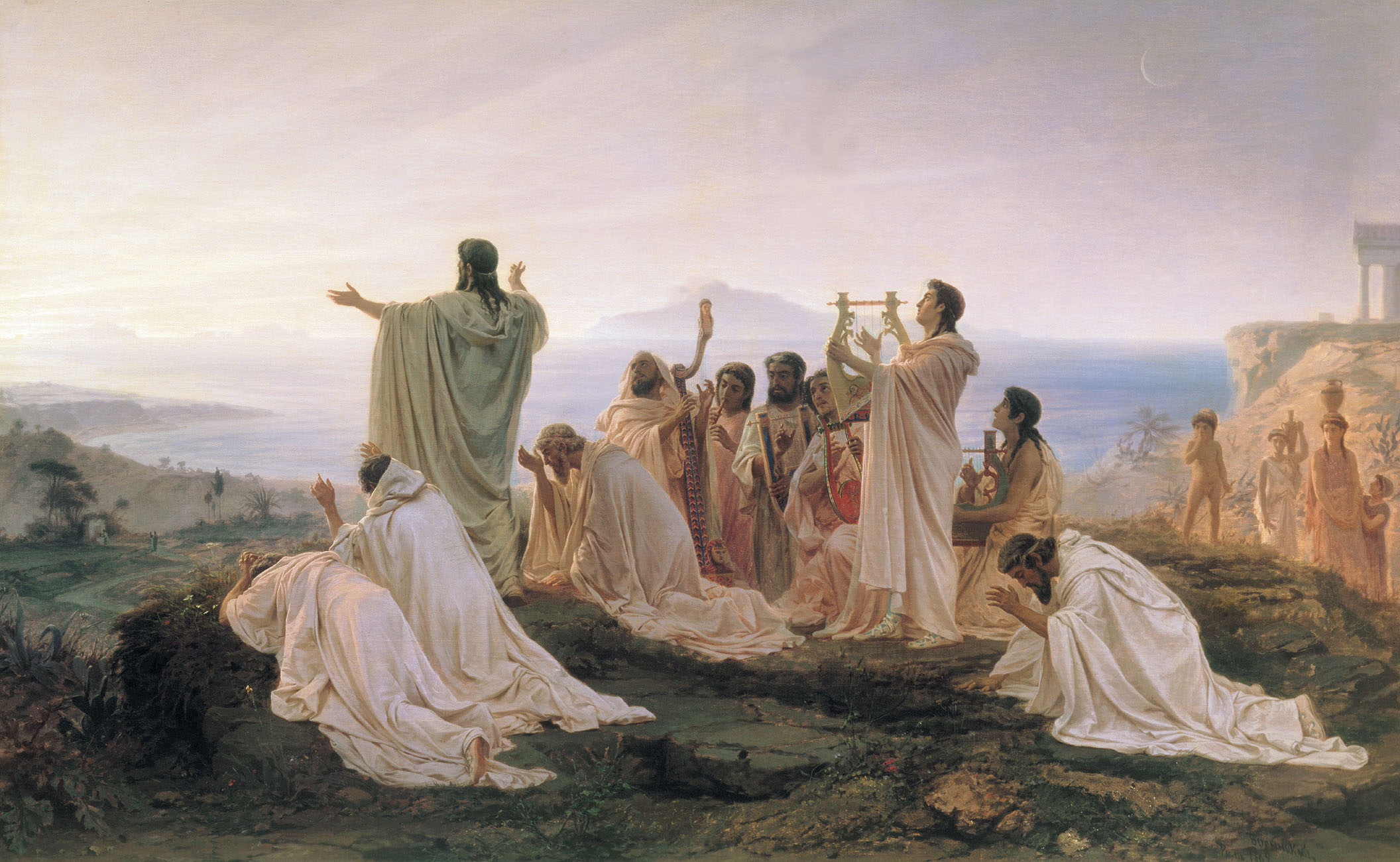
Fyodor Bronnikov, Pythagoreans' Hymn to the Rising Sun, 1869. Oil on canvas.

The Golden Verses (Ancient Greek: ἔπη χρυσᾶ or χρύσεα ἔπη, Chrysea Epē [kʰrýːsea épɛː]; Latin: Aurea Carmina) are a collection of moral exhortations comprising 71 lines written in dactylic hexameter. They are traditionally attributed to the Pythagorean philosophers.

== Overview ==
The exact origins of the Golden Verses are unknown and there are varying opinions regarding their dating. It appears that the verses may have been known as early as the third century BCE but their existence as we know them cannot be confirmed prior to the fifth century CE.

The Golden Verses enjoyed great popularity and were widely distributed in late antiquity, being often quoted. Their renown persisted during the medieval ages and into the Renaissance. In 1494 the Neoplatonic Greek scholar Constantine Lascaris published in a famous printed edition of his Grammatica, deliberately, the Golden Verses translated into Latin, thereby bringing them to a widespread audience.

The Neoplatonists used the Golden Verses as part of their preparatory program of moral instruction, and a number of Neoplatonic commentaries on the verses are extant.

An early English translation of the Golden Verses, accompanied by the commentary of the Neoplatonist Hierocles of Alexandria, was published by John Hall of Durham in his posthumous Hierocles (1657). Other early translations of the Golden Verses and Hierocles' commentary include the translation into French by André Dacier (1706) and the translation into English by Nicholas Rowe (1707). A modern critical edition and English translation of the Golden Verses was prepared by Johan C. Thom in 1995, while a recent English translation of Hierocles' commentary was published by Herman S. Schibli in 2002.

== The Golden Verses of Pythagoras (Rowe/Firth translation, modernized) ==
1. First worship the Immortal gods, as they are established and ordained by the Law.
2. Reverence the Oath, and next the Heroes, full of goodness and light.
3. Honour likewise the Terrestrial Daemons by rendering them the worship lawfully due to them.
4. Honour likewise your parents, and those most nearly related to you.
5. Of all the rest of mankind, make him your friend who distinguishes himself by his virtue.
6. Always give ear to his mild exhortations, and take example from his virtuous and useful actions.
7. Avoid as much as possible hating your friend for a slight fault.
8. Power is a near neighbour to necessity.
9. Know that all these things are just as what I have told you; and accustom yourself to overcome and vanquish these passions:--
10. First gluttony, sloth, sensuality, and anger.
11. Do nothing evil, neither in the presence of others, nor privately;
12. But above all things respect yourself.
13. In the next place, observe justice in your actions and in your words.
14. And do not accustom yourself to behave yourself in any thing without rule, and without reason.
15. But always make this reflection, that it is ordained by destiny that all men shall die.
16. And that the goods of fortune are uncertain; and that just as they may be acquired, they may likewise be lost.
17. Concerning all the calamities that men suffer by divine fortune,
18. Support your lot with patience, it is what it may be, and never complain at it.
19. But endeavour what you can to remedy it.
20. And consider that fate does not send the greatest portion of these misfortunes to good men.
21. There are many sorts of reasonings among men, good and bad;
22. Do not admire them too easily, nor reject them.
23. But if falsehoods are advanced, hear them with mildness, and arm yourself with patience.
24. Observe well, on every occasion, what I am going to tell you:--
25. Do not let any man either by his words, or by his deeds, ever seduce you.
26. Nor lure you to say or to do what is not profitable for yourself.
27. Consult and deliberate before you act, that you may not commit foolish actions.
28. For it is the part of a miserable man to speak and to act without reflection.
29. But do the thing which will not afflict you afterwards, nor oblige you to repentance.
30. Never do anything which you do not understand.
31. But learn all you ought to know, and by that means you will lead a very pleasant life.
32. In no way neglect the health of your body;
33. But give it drink and food in due measure, and also the exercise of which it needs.
34. Now by measure I mean what will not discomfort you.
35. Accustom yourself to a way of living that is neat and decent without luxury.
36. Avoid all things that will occasion envy.
37. And do not be prodigal out of season, like someone who does not know what is decent and honourable.
38. Neither be covetous nor stingy; a due measure is excellent in these things.
39. Only do the things that cannot hurt you, and deliberate before you do them.
40. Never allow sleep to close your eyelids, after you went to bed,
41. Until you have examined all your actions of the day by your reason.
42. In what have I done wrong? What have I done? What have I omitted that I ought to have done?
43. If in this examination you find that you have done wrong, reprove yourself severely for it;
44. And if you have done any good, rejoice.
45. Practise thoroughly all these things; meditate on them well; you ought to love them with all your heart.
46. It is those that will put you in the way of divine virtue.
47. I swear it by he who has transmitted into our souls the Sacred Quaternion, the source of nature, whose cause is eternal.
48. But never begin to set your hand to any work, until you have first prayed the gods to accomplish what you are going to begin.
49. When you have made this habit familiar to you,
50. You will know the constitution of the Immortal Gods and of men.
51. Even how far the different beings extend, and what contains and binds them together.
52. You shall likewise know that according to Law, the nature of this universe is in all things alike,
53. So that you shall not hope what you ought not to hope; and nothing in this world shall be hidden from you.
54. You will likewise know, that men draw upon themselves their own misfortunes voluntarily, and of their own free choice.
55. Unhappy they are! They neither see nor understand that their good is near them.
56. Few know how to deliver themselves out of their misfortunes.
57. Such is the fate that blinds humankind, and takes away his senses.
58. Like huge cylinders they roll back and forth, and always oppressed with innumerable ills.
59. For fatal strife, natural, pursues them everywhere, tossing them up and down; nor do they perceive it.
60. Instead of provoking and stirring it up, they ought to avoid it by yielding.
61. Oh! Jupiter, our Father! If you would deliver men from all the evils that oppress them,
62. Show them of what daemon they make use.
63. But take courage; the race of humans is divine.
64. Sacred nature reveals to them the most hidden mysteries.
65. If she impart to you her secrets, you will easily perform all the things which I have ordained thee.
66. And by the healing of your soul, you wilt deliver it from all evils, from all afflictions.
67. But you should abstain from the meats, which we have forbidden in the purifications and in the deliverance of the soul;
68. Make a just distinction of them, and examine all things well.
69. Leave yourself always to be guided and directed by the understanding that comes from above, and that ought to hold the reins.
70. And when, after having deprived yourself of your mortal body, you arrived at the most pure Aither,
71. You shall be a God, immortal, incorruptible, and Death shall have no more dominion over you.

== See also ==
- Pythagoreanism
- Delphic maxims
- Hierocles of Alexandria
