= Critias (dialogue) =

Dialog by Plato

Critias (/ˈkrɪtiəs/; Greek: Κριτίας), one of Plato's late dialogues, recounts the story of the mighty island kingdom Atlantis and its attempt to conquer Athens, which failed due to the ordered society of the Athenians. Critias is the second of a projected trilogy of dialogues, preceded by Timaeus and followed by Hermocrates. The latter was possibly never written and the ending to Critias has been lost. Because of their resemblance (e.g., in terms of persons appearing), modern classicists occasionally combine both Timaeus and Critias as Timaeus-Critias.

== Protagonists ==
- Timaeus

Unlike the other speakers of the Critias, it is unclear whether Timaeus is a historical figure or not. While some classicists regard him as definitively historical, others guess that "Plato's picture of him has probably borrowed traits from various quarters". Frank assumes Archytas of Tarentum to be the person which Timaeus is partly based on.

On the other hand, F. M. Cornford strongly opposes any idea of a historical Timaeus: "The very fact that a man of such distinction left not the faintest trace in political or philosophic history is against his claim to be a historical person. The probability is that Plato invented him because he required a philosopher of the Western School, eminent both in science and statesmanship, and there was no one to fill the post at the imaginary time of the dialogue". But while there is no proof for Timaeus to be historical, there is also no proof that he did not exist, since little is known of the history of the Italian city of Locri.

- Critias

From the very first comments on Timaeus and Critias in classical antiquity to the early 20th century, scholars took the identity of this Critias and the oligarch Critias for granted. The first to contradict this view was Burnet in 1914. Since then, the identity of Critias has been fiercely disputed among scholars. One group of classicists still claims him to be the famous oligarch Critias, member of the Thirty Tyrants. Another suggests that this Critias is actually the grandfather of the oligarch.

The latter group argues that there is too much distance of time between the oligarch Critias (460–403 BC) and Solon (638–558 BC), the famous lawmaker, who supposedly brought the Atlantis story from Egypt to Greece. According to Plato, Solon told the story to the great-grandfather of the Critias appearing in this dialogue, Dropides, who then told it to his son, who was also named Critias and the grandfather of the Critias in the dialogue. The elder Critias then retold the story to his grandson when he was 90 and the younger Critias was 10.

The latter group alleges that the tyrant's grandfather could not have both talked to Solon and still have been alive at the time the hypothetical discussion pictured in this dialogue was held. Thus they assume that it is the tyrant's grandfather who appears in both Timaeus and Critias, and his own grandfather, who was told the Atlantis story by Solon.

On the other hand, this obviously too long time span between Solon and Critias would not be the only anachronism in Plato's work. In fact, Plato produced quite a number of anachronisms in many of his dialogues. And further, there are indications that Solon was dated later than when he actually lived by writers prior to Aristotle.

This leads one to believe that Plato somewhat condensed the happenings of the sixth century. For his purposes, Solon lived just before Anacreon, and Anacreon in turn was active in the early fifth century. The elder Critias is not known to have achieved any personal distinction, and since he died long before Plato published the Timaeus and Critias, it would have made no sense for Plato to choose a virtually unknown statesman to appear in these dialogues who was uninteresting to his contemporaries.

- Socrates

The speaker Socrates is, of course, identical with the well-known Athenian philosopher.

- Hermocrates

Hermocrates is almost certainly the Syracusan politician and general who is also mentioned by Thucydides among others. He has the smallest share of the conversation in this dialogue. "Since the dialogue that was to bear his name was never written, we can only guess why Plato chose him. It is curious to reflect that, while Critias is to recount how the prehistoric Athens of nine thousand years ago had repelled the invasion from Atlantis and saved the Mediterranean peoples from slavery, Hermocrates would be remembered by the Athenians as the man who had repulsed their own greatest effort at imperialist expansion."

However, there has been criticism concerning the identification of Hermocrates in the dialogues with the historical Hermocrates of Syracuse. German classicist Eberz has argued that it is actually Dion of Syracuse, who explains the polity of Hermocrates in his name.

== Content ==
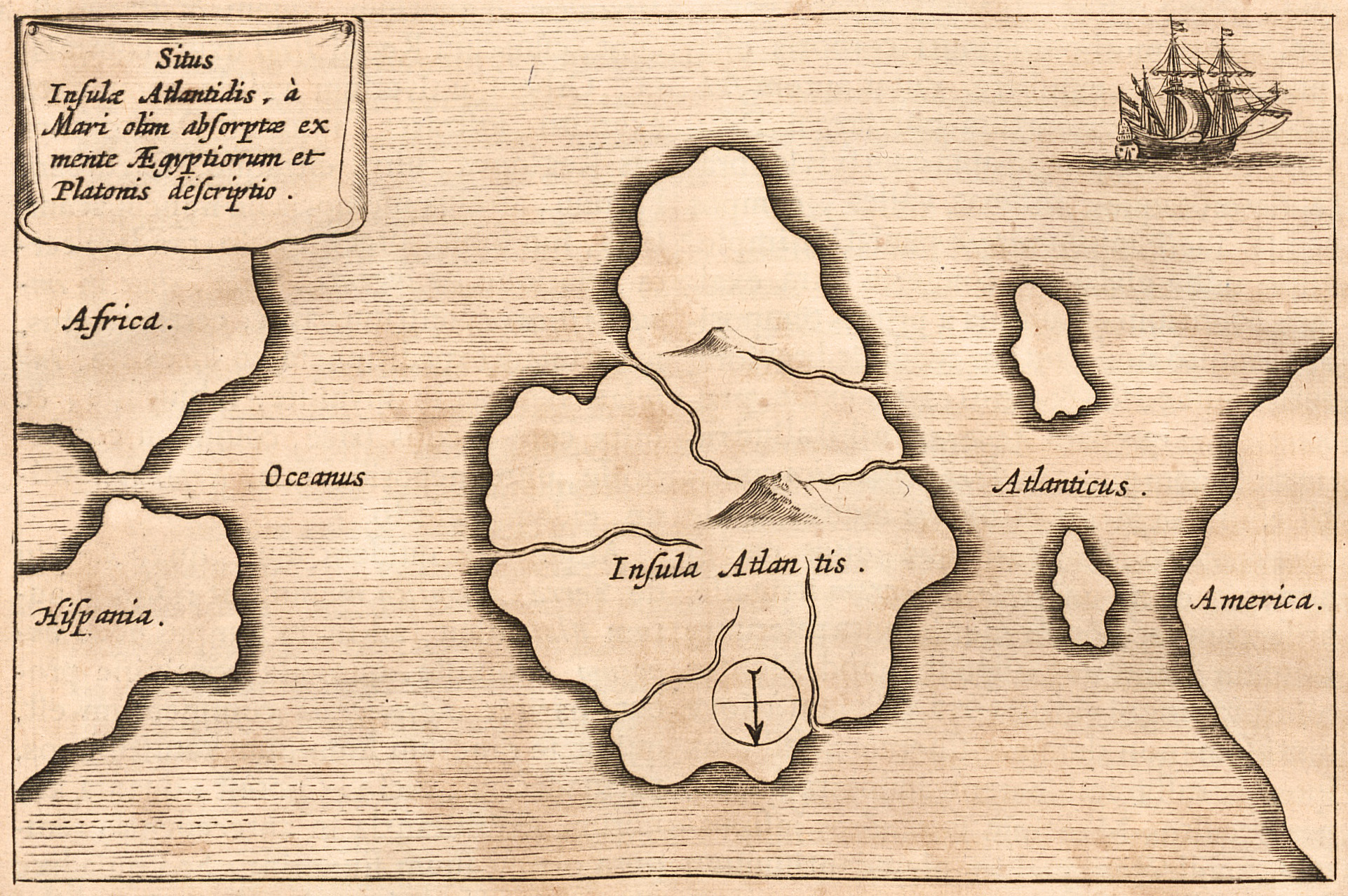
Plato's Atlantis described in Timaeus and Critias.

Essentially the story is about a good city and a city gone bad and the divinely arranged, therapeutic punishment of the bad city by its defeat at the hands of the good.

— Warman Welliver

According to Critias, in ancient times, the Earth was divided among the gods by allotment. The gods treated the humans in their districts much as shepherds treat sheep, tending and guiding them like nurselings and possessions. They did this not by force, but by persuasion. In those days, the areas which are now the islands of Greece were high hills covered in good soil.

A number of great deluges came (including the global flood of Deucalion), and because no soil washed down from the mountains to replace the lost soil, the soil in that land was stripped away, causing much of the area to sink out of sight, and the islands that remained to become the "bones of a dead body."

Athens, in those days, was very different. The land was rich and water was brought in from underground springs (which were later destroyed by earthquake). He describes the civilization of Athens at that time as ideal: pursuing all virtue, living in moderation, and excelling in their work.

He then moves on to describe the origins of Atlantis. He said that Atlantis was allotted to Poseidon. Poseidon fell in love with a mortal girl named Cleito (daughter of Evenor and Leucippe), and they had a number of children, the first of which was named Atlas, who inherited the kingdom and passed it onto his firstborn for many generations. Critias then goes into a great deal of detail in describing the island of Atlantis and the Temple to Poseidon and Cleito on the island, and refers to the legendary metal orichalcum. Critias then reiterates the remarkable virtue of the Atlanteans, saying:

For many generations, as long as the divine nature lasted in them, they were obedient to the laws, and well-affectioned towards the god, whose seed they were; for they possessed true and in every way great spirits, uniting gentleness with wisdom in the various chances of life, and in their intercourse with one another. They despised everything but virtue, caring little for their present state of life, and thinking lightly of the possession of gold and other property, which seemed only a burden to them; neither were they intoxicated by luxury; nor did wealth deprive them of their self-control; but they were sober, and saw clearly that all these goods are increased by virtue and friendship with one another, whereas by too great regard and respect for them, they are lost and friendship with them.

However, the Atlanteans became corrupt as:

...when the divine portion began to fade away, and became diluted too often and too much with the mortal admixture, and the human nature got the upper hand, they then, being unable to bear their fortune, behaved unseemly, and to him who had an eye to see grew visibly debased, for they were losing the fairest of their precious gifts; but to those who had no eye to see the true happiness, they appeared glorious and blessed at the very time when they were full of avarice and unrighteous power.

Critias then says that Zeus, the god of gods, seeing the corruption of the Atlanteans, determined to chastise them. Zeus begins to speak; but what he says, and everything that follows in the Critias, remains nonextant.

== See also ==
- Lost lands
