= Papyrus Oxyrhynchus 228 =

Fragment of Plato's Laches

Papyrus Oxyrhynchus 228 (P. Oxy. 228 or P. Oxy. II 228) is a fragment of the Laches, a dialogue of Plato, written in Greek. It was discovered in Oxyrhynchus. The manuscript was written on papyrus in the form of a roll. It is dated to the second century. It is housed in the Bodleian Library (Ms. Gr. Class. a 8) in Oxford.

== Description ==
The document was written by an unknown copyist. It contains the text of the Laches (197a - 198a) of Plato. The measurements of the fragment are 255 by 150 mm. The text is written in an upright square uncial hand of medium size. It has a remarkable number of variant textual readings. The occasional corrections were apparently made by the original scribe.

It was discovered by Grenfell and Hunt in 1897 in Oxyrhynchus. The text was published by Grenfell and Hunt in 1899.

== See also ==
- Oxyrhynchus Papyri
- Papyrus Oxyrhynchus 227
- Papyrus Oxyrhynchus 229
