= Timaeus of Locri =

Character in Plato's dialogues; purported ancient Greek philosopher

Timaeus of Locri (pronunciation in modern English /taɪˈmiːəs/; Ancient Greek: Τίμαιος ὁ Λοκρός, romanized: Tímaios ho Lokrós; Latin: Timaeus Locrus) is a character in two of Plato's dialogues, Timaeus and Critias. In both, he appears as a philosopher of the Pythagorean school. If there ever existed a historical Timaeus of Locri, he would have lived in the fifth century BC, but his historicity is dubious since he only appears as a literary figure in Plato's works; all other ancient sources are either based on Plato or are fictional accounts.

== Historicity ==
In Plato's works, Timaeus appears as a wealthy aristocrat from the Greek colony of Lokroi Epizephyrioi (present-day Locri in Calabria) in Magna Graecia, who had served in high offices in his native town before coming to Athens, where the dialogue of Timaeus is set. Plato does not explicitly label Timaeus a Pythagorean, but leaves enough hints for the reader to infer this. He appears competent in all areas of ancient philosophy, especially natural philosophy and astronomy.

In antiquity, Timaeus's historical existence was beyond dispute. Cicero reports that Plato traveled to Italy to study with Timaeus and other Pythagoreans. The report of this meeting led Macrobius, a writer of late antiquity, to conclude that Timaeus could not have been in a face-to-face dialogue with Socrates, who, by Timaeus's time, was long dead. Iamblichus lists Timaeus among the notable members of the Pythagorean school. Diogenes Laërtius in his Lives and Opinions of Eminent Philosophers, suggests that the character of Timaeus was based on the Pythagorean Philolaus. Further references to Timaeus are found in Proclus, Commentary on Plato's Timaeus (II, 38, I); in commentaries on Aristotle by Simplicius; and in Porphyry, where Timaeus mentions the house of Pythagoras in Croton.

Modern scholarship tends to dismiss Timaeus's historicity, treating him as a literary figure constructed by Plato from features of the Pythagoreans known to him, such as Archytas. The main reason for assigning the status of a literary fiction to Timaeus is the lack of any information that does not stem ultimately from Plato's dialogues. As a counterargument, it has been pointed out that most characters appearing in Plato's dialogues are in fact historical persons.

== On the Nature of the World and the Soul ==
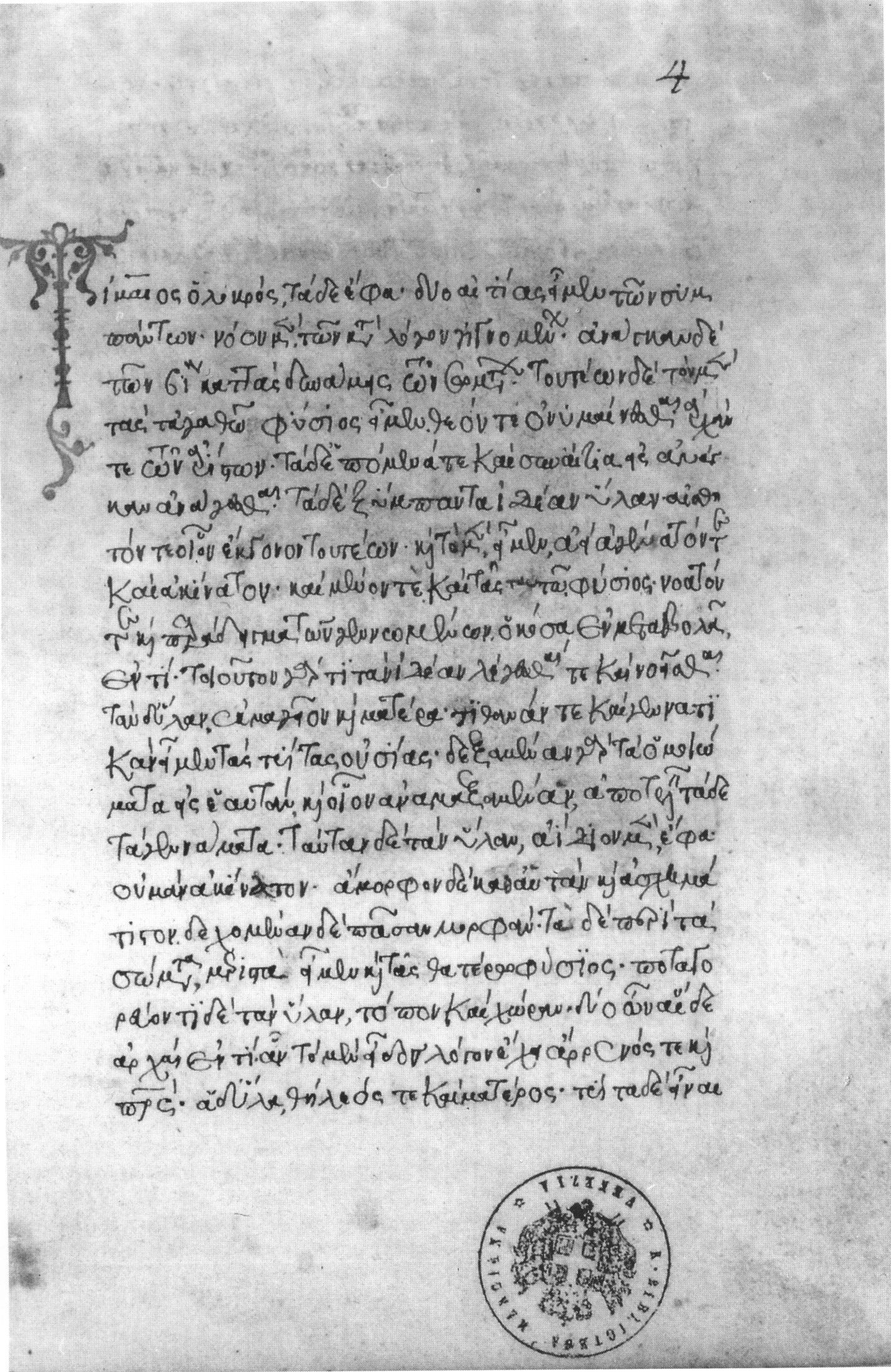
Pseudo-Timaios of Locri, On the Nature of the World and the Soul in a manuscript in the possession of Cardinal Bessarion. Venice, Biblioteca Nazionale Marciana, Gr. 517, fol. 4r (fifteenth century)

A work in Doric Greek entitled On the Nature of the World and the Soul (Ancient Greek: Περὶ φύσιος κόσμω καὶ ψυχᾶς, romanized: Peri phýsios kósmō kai psychās), also called the Timaeus Locrus after its purported author, starts out by declaring that: "Timaeus of Locri said the following", and proceeds to summarize the theories that Timaeus defends in Plato's Timaeus. The book has been preserved fully, in more than fifty manuscripts. It is mostly consistent with Plato; it notably omits the Theory of Forms.

On the World and the Soul was first mentioned in sources of the second century AD (Nicomachus and the commentary on Timaeus by Calvisius Taurus) and its authenticity was not doubted in antiquity. The work was even believed to have been a main source for Plato's dialogue; a rumor dating back to the third century BC held that Plato's Timaeus was plagiarized from a Pythagorean book, and this became connected to the Timaeus Locrus.

Modern philology has shown that On the World and the Soul is a pseudepigraphon written between the early first century BC to the early first century AD, and is based on Plato's Timaeus, rather than the other way around. The Pseudo-Timaeus employs a simplified mode of reasoning and presentation, presenting conclusions rather than arguments and omitting any dialogue, meaning that it was perhaps intended as a summary of the notoriously difficult original for use in a classroom setting. While it may have originated in part as a set of lecture notes to the Platonic original, it tends to omit difficult sections of the Timaeus rather than provide explanations. Some of Pseudo-Timaeus's theses are very hard to understand without knowledge of Plato's work.

On the World and the Soul shows traces of middle Platonist ideas and terminology; in particular, it resembles works by Eudorus of Alexandria and Philo, making it plausible that the author lived in Alexandria and was familiar with Eudorus's philosophy. He modernized the natural philosophy of Plato's Timaeus by incorporating insights from Hellenistic astronomy and medicine.

The book also appears to incorporate material from one or more now-lost commentaries on Timaeus. R. Harder hypothesized that the composition of On the World and the Soul was a two-step process, whereby Pseudo-Timaeus, the author of the preserved version of the book, would have edited an earlier, Hellenistic variant of Timaeus. Th. Tobin, by contrast, believes the work to have been composed at once, then translated into Doric.

=== Reception ===
On the Nature of the World and the Soul was known to the Neoplatonists Iamblichus, Syrianus, Proclus, and Simplicius. The work of Pseudo-Timaeus supported the widely held Neoplatonist conviction that Pythagoreanism and Platonism constituted a singular theory, reflecting the pseudonymous author's intention of placing Plato in the Pythagorean tradition.

Giorgio Valla, in the fifteenth century, translated On the Nature of the World and the Soul into Latin. His translation was printed in Venice in 1498. The Greek text appeared as part of Aldo Manuzio's collected works of Plato, first published in 1513 and reprinted many times. In the sixteenth century, it was considered a Vorlage of the Timaeus (so in Henri Estienne's edition) and often printed along with the works of Plato.

== Attributions of other works ==
The Suda and various scholia on Plato's Timaeus ascribe to Timaeus of Locri a work entitled Mathēmatiká, of which nothing else is known. This is possibly a false attribution, confusing Timaeus with an astronomer bearing the same name. He is also reported to have authored a biography of Pythagoras, but this may be a confusion with the historian Timaeus of Tauromenium, who devoted part of his history to Pythagoras's life and work.

== See also ==
- List of speakers in Plato's dialogues
