= Socrates the Younger =

4th-century BCE Athenian philosopher

Socrates the Younger (Greek: Σωκράτης ὁ νεώτερος, Sōkrátēs ho neōteros, c. 415 – 4th century BCE) was an ancient Athenian philosopher. Ancient texts suggest that he was a young student of the elder Socrates and later a cohort of Plato. He is best remembered for his depiction in Plato's Statesman, and scholars have suggested that he had ties to Academic and Pythagorean philosophy.

== Life and thought ==
Little is known of Socrates the Younger's life, although several clues from the writing of Plato have led scholars to posit his significance in the later circle of the elder Socrates and the early Academy. Socrates the Younger is depicted as a youth in the Statesman, as well as the Theaetetus and Sophist dialogues in which he is also present, the 399 BCE dramatic dates of which place his birth less than two decades prior. In the Theaetetus, his character is a student of the mathematician Theodorus of Cyrene and interested in algebraic and geometric theory.

The apocryphal Eleventh Letter attributed to Plato mentions a Socrates, considered by some scholars to be Socrates the Younger. The severe case of his strangury described in the letter may reference his death, which would thus approximately date to 360. The Eleventh Letter further suggests that he was involved in the Academy during this period.

Less still is known of Socrates the Younger's thought. A mention in Book 7 of Aristotle's Metaphysics seems to indicate that he remained active as a philosopher. Some scholars have interpreted Aristotle's remarks as describing Socrates the Younger's model of the human as using geometric metaphors to describe human essence, which was ultimately not reliant on its parts. This, along with his depiction as a student of Theodorus and friend of the mathematician Theaetetus in the Platonic literature, suggests his possible association with Pythagoreanism.

== See also ==
- List of speakers in Plato's dialogues
