= Hermotimus =

Hermotimus may refer to:

- Hermotimus (spider), a genus of spiders
- Hermotimus or Concerning the Sects a philosophical dialogue written by Lucian of Samosata
- Hermotimus of Pedasa, Xerxes' chief eunuch
- Hermotimus of Clazomenae, an ancient Greek philosopher
- Hermotimus of Colophon, an ancient Greek mathematician
