= Theaetetus (dialogue) =

Socratic dialogue by Plato concerning the nature of knowledge

The Theaetetus (/ˌθiːɪˈtiːtəs/; Greek: Θεαίτητος Theaítētos, lat. Theaetetus) is a philosophical work written by Plato in the early-middle 4th century BCE that investigates the nature of knowledge and is considered one of the founding works of epistemology. Like many of Plato's works, the Theaetetus is written in the form of a dialogue, in this case between Socrates and the young mathematician Theaetetus and his teacher Theodorus of Cyrene. In the dialogue, Socrates and Theaetetus attempt to come up with a definition of episteme, or knowledge, and discuss three definitions of knowledge: knowledge as nothing but perception, knowledge as true judgment, and, finally, knowledge as a true judgment with an account. Each of these definitions is shown to be unsatisfactory as the dialogue ends in aporia as Socrates leaves to face a hearing for his trial for impiety.

As one of the major works of Plato's theory of knowledge, the Theaetetus was influential on Platonism from at least the time of the Skeptical Academy of the 3rd century BCE through the Neoplatonism of the 6th century CE. It has also been the subject of increased attention in modern times as a result of its influence on Edmund Gettier, who challenged the existing definitions of knowledge as a "justified true belief" in a paper that investigated Plato's theory of knowledge as outlined in this work.

== Date and setting ==
The Theaetetus is one of the few works of Plato that gives contextual clues on the timeline of its authorship: the dialogue is framed by a brief scene in which Euclid of Megara and his friend Terpsion witness a wounded Theataetus returning on his way home after from fighting in an Athenian battle at Corinth, from which he apparently died of his wounds. Euclid tells his friend that he has a written record of a dialogue between Socrates and Theaetetus, which occurred when Theaetetus was quite a young man. The dialogue is then read aloud to the two men by a slave owned by Euclid.

The exact timeline of which battle at Corinth has been a matter of some disagreement between scholars: it has generally been presumed that the battle occurred in 369 BC; when Theaetetus would have been in his late forties, but more recently, scholars including Debra Nails have argued that the battle referenced in the dialogue was a different battle in Corinth that occurred much earlier, in 391 BC, when Theatetus would have been in his late 20s.

As far as internal characteristics, the dialogue is considered to be similar to the "earlier" dialogues of Plato, such as the Euthyphro or the Crito, in that Plato's Socrates discusses the nature of knowledge in the Theaetetus without giving any of his own views, and the dialogue ultimately ends in aporia without a satisfying answer. However, it also resembles many of the more philosophically complex "later" dialogues such as Parmenides, Phaedrus and the dialogues Sophist and Statesman which serve as a narrative sequel.

== Characters of the dialogue ==
- Euclid of Megara - the founder of the Megarian school of philosophy, a student of Socrates and contemporary of Plato.
- Terpsion - a friend of Euclid who is unknown outside of this dialogue, although later fables about him, that were likely written on the basis of this dialogue are preserved by Plutarch and in the Cynic epistles.
- Socrates - the famous teacher of Plato, who was executed by the people of Athens in 399 BC. In the dialogue, which takes place just before Socrates visits the Palace of the King Archon for his trial, Socrates is an old man of about 70.
- Theodorus - a Greek mathematician from Cyrene, a prosperous Greek colony on the coast of North Africa, in what is now Libya, on the eastern end of the Gulf of Sidra. Theodorus explored the theory of incommensurable quantities, and according to Diogenes Laertius, was said to have taught mathematics to Plato, although the historicity of this claim cannot be verified.
- Theaetetus - A Greek mathematician from Athens, who is credited in Book X of Euclid's Elements with developing a method for measuring irrational lengths in terms of square roots, as well as the proof that there are precisely five regular convex polyhedra. According to the dialogue, he evidently resembled Socrates in the snubness of his nose and bulging of his eyes. He apparently died from wounds and dysentery after the battle in Corinth that occurs in the frame story of the dialogue.

Socrates, Theaetetus, and Theodorus reappear the following day in the Sophist an apparent continuation of the conversation contained within the book of Euclid, where they are also joined by an unnamed Eleatic stranger and a boy also named Socrates.

== Outline ==
The narrative of the dialogue is set in a wrestling school. Socrates asks Theodorus if he knows of any geometry students who show particular promise. Theodorus assures him that he does, but that he does not want to over-praise the boy, lest anyone suspect he is in love with him. He says that the boy, Theaetetus, is a young Socrates look-alike, rather homely, with a snub-nose and protruding eyes. The two older men spot Theaetetus rubbing himself down with oil, and Theodorus reviews the facts about him, that he is intelligent, virile, and an orphan whose inheritance has been squandered by trustees. Socrates declares Theaetetus will have benefited from discovering what he does not know, and that he may be better able to approach the topic in the future. The conversation ends with Socrates' announcement that he has to go to court to face a criminal indictment.

Socrates tells Theaetetus that he cannot make out what knowledge is, and is looking for a simple formula for it. Theaetetus says he really has no idea how to answer the question, and Socrates tells him that he is there to help. Socrates says he has modelled his career after his midwife mother. She delivered babies and for his part, Socrates can tell when a young man is in the throes of trying to give birth to a thought. Socrates considers his philosophical work as midwifery (Maieutics). This method, later also called Socratic method, consists in eliciting knowledge by a series of questions and answers.

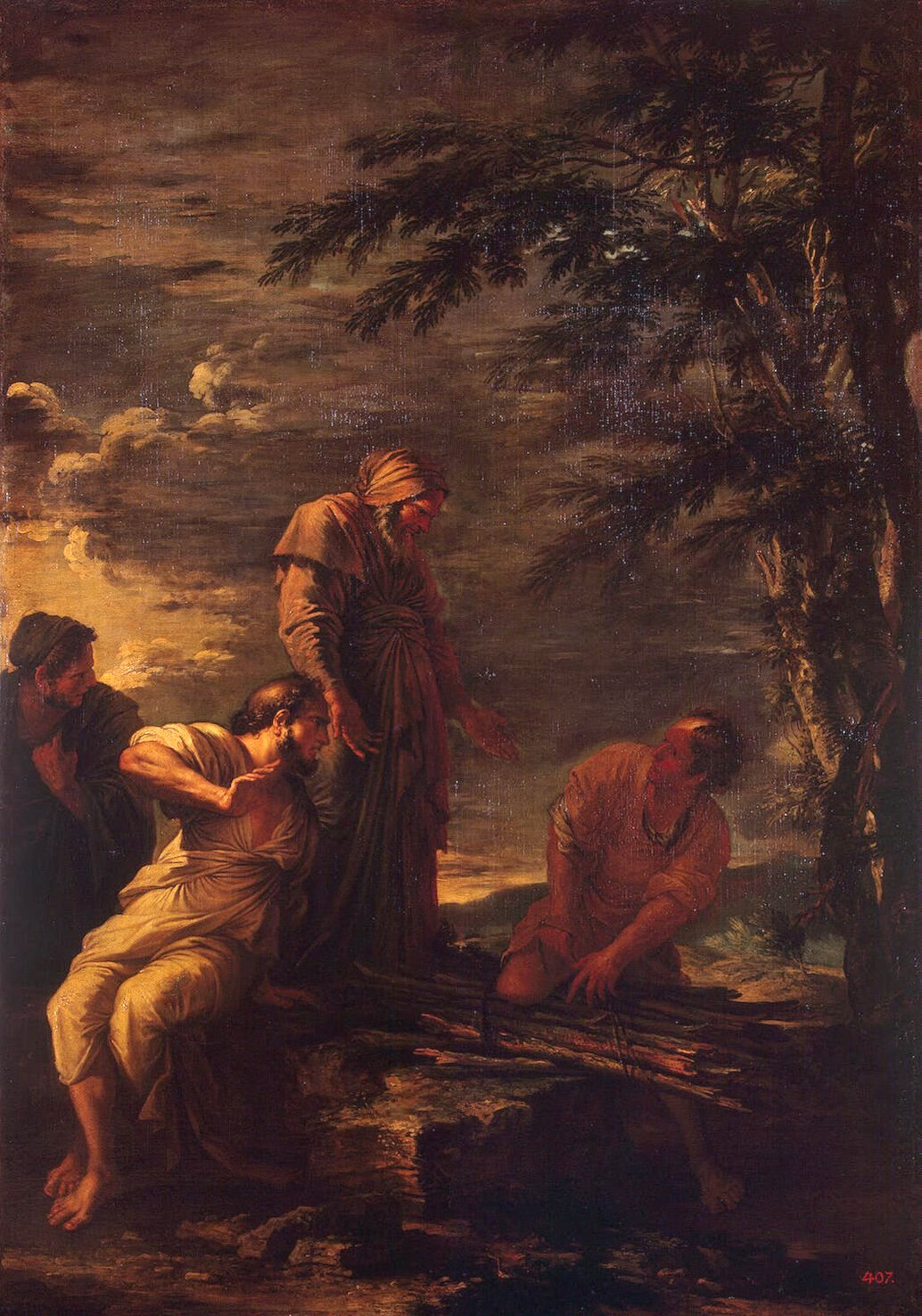
Protagoras, shown at the right with Democritus, was famous for the quote "Man is the measure of all things" and argued that knowledge was obtained from the senses.

=== Protagoras' theory of knowledge ===
Socrates thinks that the idea that knowledge is perception must be identical in meaning, if not in actual words, to Protagoras' famous maxim "Man is the measure of all things."

Socrates wrestles to conflate the two ideas, and stirs in for good measure a claim about Homer being the captain of a team of Heraclitan flux theorists. Socrates dictates a complete textbook of logical fallacies to the bewildered Theaetetus. When Socrates tells the child that he (Socrates) will later be smaller without losing an inch because Theaetetus will have grown relative to him, the child complains of dizziness. (Note: 155c) In an often quoted line, Socrates says with delight that "wonder (thaumazein) belongs to the philosopher". He admonishes the boy to be patient and bear with his questions, so that his hidden beliefs may be yanked out into the bright light of day. When Socrates sums up what they have agreed on so far, it becomes problematic that knowledge is sense perception, for Socrates raises the question that "When the same wind blows, one of us feels cold and the other not?" As a result, he introduces the idea of Heraclitean flux to act as a defense to the wind objection. Heracliteanism shows that "Nothing is in itself just one thing... Everything is in a process of coming to be". Thus as there is no fixed meaning in things, but they draw their meaning in a referential difference to other things, the wind objection can be incorporated into Theaetetus's claim that "Knowledge is sense perception". As a result, they can then continue their inquiry as to the truth of this claim. The Heraclitean doctrine of Flux is not the same as the Protagorean doctrine. The Protagorean is radical truth relativism whereas the Heraclitean is radical reality relativism. It serves as a supporting theory to the Protagorean interpretation of Theaetetus's claim, in order that they might fully inquire as to the validity of this premise. Socrates admits that it is unfortunate that Protagoras is dead and cannot defend his idea against people such as himself. He says that the two of them are "trampling on his orphan" (Note: 164e) but the charge remains. Since Protagoras is dead, Socrates puts himself in the sophist's shoes and tries to do him the favor of defending his idea. (Note: 166a–168c) Socrates concedes that if Protagoras were still alive, he would have more to say in his own defense, and that they are now essentially mistreating "his orphan child." Putting words in the dead sophist's mouth, Socrates declares that Protagoras asserts with his maxim that all things are in motion and whatever seems to be the case, is the case for the perceiver, whether the individual or the state. At the end of his speech, Socrates admits to Theodorus that Protagoras would have done a far better job of defending his own ideas. Theodorus tells Socrates that he must be kidding, that he has come to the task with boyish vigor. Theodorus does not claim to be a disciple of Protagoras, but states that he was a friend. Socrates invites Theodorus to put up a more vigorous defense of Protagoras, as he does not want it suggested that he has used the child's timidity (of Theaetetus) to aid him in his argument against the doctrine of Protagoras. (Note: 168d) Socrates, not at all certain that he has not misrepresented Protagoras in making each man the measure of his own wisdom, presses Theodorus on the question of whether any follower of Protagoras (himself included) would contend that nobody thinks anyone else is wrong. (Note: 170c) Theodorus proves to be helpless against Socrates' arguments. He agrees that Protagoras concedes that those who disagree with him are correct. (Note: 171a) In making Protagoras a complete epistemological relativist, where every person's individual perceptions are his reality and his truth, both Socrates and Theodorus paint Protagoras as maintaining an absurd position.

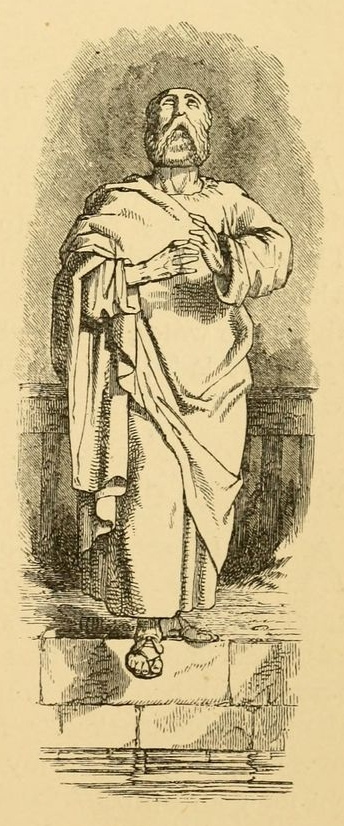
Socrates recounts the tale of the philosopher who was so caught up in looking at the stars that he fell into a well.

Socrates then proceeds to explain why philosophers seem clumsy and stupid to the common lot of humanity. Socrates explains that philosophers are open to mockery because they are not concerned about what interests most people: they could not care less about the scandals in their neighbor's house, the tracing of one's ancestry to Heracles, and so on. In contrast, the philosopher is concerned with things that are, such as beauty and knowledge, which are "truly higher up". It is here that Socrates draws the classic portrait of the absent-minded intellectual who cannot make his bed or cook a meal (175e). Socrates adds a big bifurcation to this speech, saying that there are only two kinds of lives to be lived: a divinely happy one, lived by righteous philosophers or a godless, miserable one, such as most people live. (Note: 176–177) Socrates admits this was a digression that threatens to drown his original project, which was to define knowledge. Theodorus, the old geometer, tells Socrates that he finds this sort of thing easier to follow than his earlier arguments. Socrates says that the men of flux, like Homer and Heraclitus, are really hard to talk to because you can't pin them down. When you ask them a question, he says, they pluck from their quiver a little aphorism to let fly at you, and as you try to figure that one out, they wing another one at you. They leave nothing settled either in discourse, or in their own minds. Socrates adds that the opposite school of thought, that teaches of the "immovable whole" is just as hard to talk to. (Note: 181a,b) Socrates says he met the father of the idea, Parmenides, when he was quite young, but does not want to get into another digression over it. (Note: 184a)

=== Definitions of knowledge ===
Socrates compares the human mind to an aviary. Socrates draws the distinction between having and possessing; the former typically implies the latter, though on the other hand, one can possess something, such as a bird, without actually having it (with them at any moment). (Note: 199a) Socrates says that as a man goes hunting about in his mind for knowledge of something, he might grab hold of the wrong thing. He says that mistaking eleven for twelve is like going in for a pigeon and coming up with a dove, (Note: 199b) Theaetetus joins in the game, and says that to complete the picture, you need to envision pieces of ignorance flying around in there with the birds. But if this is the case, how would you be able to distinguish between the birds representing real knowledge and the ones representing false ones? Are there other birds that represent this type of knowledge? Socrates comes to the conclusion that this is absurd and therefore he discards the aviary analogy. After discarding the bird-cage analogy, Socrates and Theaetetus return to the definition of knowledge as 'true judgement'. (Note: 200e) This, Theaetetus argues, is true because it is 'free from mistakes.' (Note: 200e) However Socrates introduces an example of a jury in the law-courts, being persuaded of an opinion by a lawyer. This persuasion is not the same as knowing the truth, as all is produced is 'conviction' in judging whatever the lawyers want. (Note: 201a) Although Theaetetus hopes it is possible the lawyer will be able to 'persuade' the jury of the truth, (Note: 201b) Socrates is unsatisfied as if they are justly persuaded, they will have true knowledge. However, in Socrates' belief, they cannot make a correct judgement as they would not have true knowledge. (Note: 201c) With this conflict, Socrates decides that true judgement and knowledge must be different things. After distinguishing between knowledge and true judgement, Theaetetus recalls being told that true judgement 'with an account (logos) equates to knowledge. (Note: 201d) Things without an account are 'unknowable', while things with an account are 'knowable'.

Socrates responds by telling of a dream, in which he overheard people talking of primary elements. (Note: 201e) These primary elements can only be named, they cannot be thought of as existing or not - he gives examples of words like 'itself, or that, each, alone or this.' (Note: 202a) While they can be added to other words, they by themselves are just a name. When these elements are added together, Socrates says that a 'complex' is formed. (Note: 202b) The primary elements are 'unaccountable and unknowable, but perceivable' while the complexes are 'knowable and expressible' and so can be objects of 'true judgement'. (Note: 202b) He concludes his dream by agreeing with Theaetetus that knowledge is 'true judgement with an account.' (Note: 202c) However, Socrates exposes some difficulties by examining letters. He takes the first two letters of his name, S and O to wonder if the syllable 'So' is knowable while the individual letters are not. (Note: 203b–d) Theaetetus finds the idea strange, so Socrates deduces that in order to know the syllable, the letters must be known first. (Note: 203e) Socrates proposes that the syllable can be a 'single form' produced from the letters. With this in mind, Socrates considers whether the 'sum' and the 'whole' are the same. (Note: 204a) Theaetetus initially says they are not, but changes his mind in confusion when Socrates leads him through maths and the different ways of expressing the number six. (Note: 204c–205b) After agreeing this, Socrates returns to the subject of syllables and letters to conclude from Theaetetus' answers that syllables are different from letters and cannot contain letters. (Note: 205b) Theaetetus admits this idea is ridiculous. (Note: 205c) Socrates returns to talking about elements and complexes to propose that they are in the same class, as they have 'no parts and [are] a single form.' (Note: 205d) Socrates sums up this reversal by remarking that if anyone tries to tell them the complex is knowable and expressable while the element is the opposite, 'we had better not listen to him'. (Note: 205e) He cites the example of a musician distinguishing individual notes (conceded to be elements of music) to propose that elements are 'much more clearly known.' (Note: 206b) Socrates proposes an account to be 'making one's thought apparent vocally by means of words and verbal expressions.' (Note: 206d) However, he wonders if that is so, everyone will be able to make judgement 'with an account' as they can all (except for the deaf and dumb) vocalize and express opinions on matters. (Note: 206e) Socrates examines it further by suggesting that a man who can vocalize his judgement must be able to make reference to the primary elements of the subject. (Note: 207a) Giving an example of defining a wagon by its individual parts, (Note: 207a) agreement is reached that an account is 'going through a thing element by element.' (Note: 207d) Socrates questions Theaetetus by drawing on his learning of how to write, and the idea that if you misplace individual elements (letters) of a name, that does not mean you have knowledge of it. (Note: 208a) This finishes Socrates' second definition of an account as 'the way to the whole through the elements'. (Note: 208c)

The third definition Socrates offers is 'being able to tell some mark by which the object you are asked about differs from all other things', (Note: 208c) giving the example that the Sun is distinct for its brightness. However, this definition of an account fails as by getting to know the differentness of an object, you have to acquire knowledge about it. Thus the answer to the initial question 'What is knowledge' would be heavily circuitous - correct judgement accompanied by 'knowledge' of the differentness, which Socrates admits is 'silly'. (Note: 210a)

Socrates concludes the dialogue by announcing that all the two have produced are mere "wind-eggs" and that he must be getting on now to the courthouse to face his trial being brought against him by Meletus.

== Significant references in the dialogue ==
In this dialogue, Socrates refers to Epicharmus of Kos as "the prince of Comedy" and Homer as "the prince of Tragedy", and both as "great masters of either kind of poetry". (Note: "Summon the great masters of either kind of poetry- Epicharmus, the prince of Comedy, and Homer of Tragedy", Theaetetus, by Plato, section §152e (translation by Benjamin Jowett). There is some variability in translation of the passage. Words like "king", "chief", "leader", "master" are used in the place of "prince" in different translations. The basic Greek word in Plato is ἄκροι akroi from ἄκρος akros meaning topmost or high up. In this context it means "of a degree highest of its kind" or "consummate" (cf. Liddell & Scott, A Greek–English Lexicon).) This is significant because it is one of the very few extant references in greater antiquity (fourth century BCE) to Epicharmus and his work. Another reference is in Plato's Gorgias dialogue.

The dialogue references the Trial of Socrates, which takes place in 399 BCE and which the main dialogue immediately precedes. At the end of the dialogue, as Socrates is leaving to face a hearing at the Porch of the King Archon, he agrees to meet Theaetetus and Theodorus in the same place the following day, a conversation that is recounted in the Sophist and Statesman dialogues. The dialogue Euthyphro also is set on the same day, and would have occurred immediately after the Theaetetus, as it occurs outside the Porch of the King Archon as Socrates awaits his hearing.

The dialogue includes the earliest reference to The Astrologer who Fell into a Well, one of Aesop's fables, in which the pre-Socratic philosopher Thales, who is known for his work in astronomy and his successful prediction of a solar eclipse, is so distracted by the stars that he forgets the ground below him, and proceeds to trip over a well.

== Legacy ==
=== Later Platonism ===
The Theaetetus was a popular dialogue in classical antiquity. Writing in the 1st century BCE, the Middle Platonist Eudorus of Alexandria references the definition of a philosopher as a "likeness to a god" (Note: 176b) and uses it to justify his synthesis of Platonism with Pythagorean teachings on virtue. One of Eudorus's contemporaries, Philo of Alexandria also quoted from it frequently, implying that he considered it an important work. The Theaetetus was also the subject of many philosophical commentaries. The earliest surviving Platonic commentary, dating from between the 1st century BCE and the 2nd century CE, is an anonymous commentary on the Theaetetus, which goes into detail on the nature of knowledge outlined in the work and compares it to the definitions of knowledge outlined in the Meno. The Theaetetus is also referenced frequently by Alcinous in his Handbook of Platonism.

In Late antiquity, the work was included in the Neoplatonic curriculum of twelve dialogues developed by Iamblichus, where it was preceded by the Cratylus, and considered a theoretical work on logic.

=== Gettier problems ===
In the 20th century, the dialogue and its definition of knowledge as a "Justified True Belief" were investigated by Edmund Gettier, who investigated Platonic epistemology as related in the Theaetetus and the Meno is his work "Is Justified True Belief Knowledge (1963)" where he develops the Gettier problem, an example of the type of scenario which challenges the notion that a justified true belief is the same thing as knowledge.

=== Wittgenstein ===
In the later years of his philosophy Wittgenstein took an interest in the Theaetetus. He sent a copy of it to his friend Maurice O'Connor Drury and told him that "Plato in this dialogue is occupied with the same problems that I am writing about". He later quoted the text in Philosophical Investigations. Although he found that the text was preoccupied with the same problems he was dealing with, he critiqued what he considered the false pretence of discussion, telling O.K. Bouwsma that "The young man Theaetetus is introduced as a promising, bright youngster, but he shows none of this. He has no fight in him at all. Why doesn't he make a stand? Socrates arguing with these weaklings!"

== Texts and translations ==
The Theaetetus has been translated into English along with the rest of the Works of Plato

- Plato's Theaetetus translated by Benjamin Jowett (Internet Archive, 1892, text page 193)
- Plato: Theaetetus, Sophist. Greek with translation by Harold N. Fowler. Loeb Classical Library 123. Harvard Univ. Press (originally published 1921). ISBN 978-0674991378 HUP listing
- The full text is available from the Perseus Project in both Greek and English (Fowler translation).
- Plato. Opera, volume I. Oxford Classical Texts. ISBN 978-0198145691
- Plato. Complete Works. Hackett, 1997. ISBN 978-0872203495

== Notes ==
=== Stephanus numbers ===
As is standard for the works of Plato, reference numbers are to the page numbers of the 1572 edition of Henri Estienne (Stephanus). Quotations are to the edition by Benjamin Jowett, which is freely available and in the public domain.
