= Hermotimus coriaceus =

Scientific classification
- Kingdom: Animalia
- Phylum: Arthropoda
- Subphylum: Chelicerata
- Class: Arachnida
- Order: Araneae
- Infraorder: Araneomorphae
- Family: Salticidae
- Subfamily: Salticinae
- Genus: Hermotimus; Simon, 1903
- Species: H. coriaceus

Binomial name
- Hermotimus coriaceus Simon, 1903

Species of spider

Hermotimus coriaceus is a species of jumping spiders found in West Africa. It is the sole species in the genus Hermotimus.

== Name ==
Hermotimus of Pedasa was a eunuch guardian of the Persian king Xerxes. However, the genus name could also refer to Hermotimus of Clazomenae, an early Greek philosopher.

The species name is derived from Latin, meaning "leathery".
