= Terpsion =

Ancient philosopher from Megara

Terpsion (Ancient Greek: Τερψίων, gen.: Τερψίωνος; fl. 5th–4th century BCE) of Megara is a speaker in Plato's dialogues. In the frame story which serves as the prologue to Plato's Theaetetus, Terpsion asks his friend Euclid of Megara to recount the dialogue between Socrates and Theaetetus. Terpsion also appears in the Phaedo as one of the people who was present at the death of Socrates. Debra Nails states that nothing else reliable can be determined about Terpsion, and all later sources that mention him, such as Plutarch and the pseudonymous Socratic letters, are derived from the account in Plato's dialogues.

== See also ==
- List of speakers in Plato's dialogues
