= Platonic division =

Platonic division may refer to:

- The Analogy of the Divided Line, Plato's schematic representation of all possible metaphysics, epistemology, and ethics on four hierarchical levels in the Republic, Book 6
- Plato's tripartite theory of soul, Plato's partitioned organization of the Soul as presented in the Phaedo and the Republic
- Plato's five regimes, Republic, Book 8, are Plato's forms of government Aristocracy, Timocracy, Oligarchy, Democracy, and Tyranny
- Plato's Collection and Division or diairesis, a logical method of definition by division
