= Diairesis =

Epistemology classification method

Diairesis (Ancient Greek: διαίρεσις, romanized: diaíresis, "division") is a form of classification used in ancient (especially Platonic) logic that serves to systematize concepts and come to definitions. When defining a concept using diairesis, one starts with a broad concept, then divides this into two or more specific sub-concepts, and this procedure is repeated until a definition of the desired concept is reached. Aristotle makes extensive use of diaresis in categorization as basis for syllogizing. He makes clear, however, that definition by diaresis does not in itself prove anything. Apart from this definition, the procedure also results in a taxonomy of other concepts, ordered according to a general–specific relation.

The founder of diairesis as a method was Plato. Later ancient logicians (including Aristotle) and practitioners of other ancient sciences have employed diairetic modes of classification, e.g., to classify plants in ancient biology.

== Plato's method of definition ==
Diairesis is Plato's later method of definition based on division, developed in the Platonic dialogues Phaedrus, Sophist, Statesman, and Philebus. Further applications are found in the Laws and Timaeus. It is a means of attempting to reach a definition by which a collection of candidates is repeatedly divided into two parts with one part eliminated until a suitable definition is discovered.

A complementary term is merismos (cf. English merism: parsing or the distinguishing of parts, as opposed to diairesis, which is the division of a genus into its parts).

For example, in the Sophist (§235B), the Eleatic Stranger is examining illusions, which consist of words and "visual objects." By using diairesis, he divides visual objects, by which it becomes clear he means works of art, into two categories: eikastikē technē, the art of making likenesses or eikones; and phantastikē technē, the art of creating illusionary appearances. The Stranger is much more fond of the former; the latter is only created to produce an appearance of beauty.

== The method of diairesis in the history of philosophy ==
=== Forerunners of Plato ===
Opinions about possible forerunners of Platonic diairesis are varying; they even reach back until Homer. Also an adoption from the fields of mathematics has been considered, like one from musicology, one from pre-scientific and everyday divisions and one from medicine. About forerunners in the field of philosophy there are as well different opinions. Under consideration are Prodicus of Ceos, Democritus, Leucippus, and the sophists. It was even suggested that Plato says that he himself found the new method, which shows that it is possible that Plato had no forerunners at all.

=== Later exponents of the method of diairesis ===
The platonic method of division is found to be applied at the first steps of classifying biology, namely in the zoology of Aristotle and in the botany of Theophrastus. Diairesis is central to Galen's therapeutics; see for example 'Therapeutics to Glaucon' 1 (XI, 4 K), where Galen, attributing the method to Plato, asserts that 'the errors of the [medical] sects and whatever mistakes the majority of physicians make in the care of the sick have incompetent division as their principal and major cause' (tr. Dickson.) Philosophically relevant methodical divisions or statements about the method of diairesis can be found in members of the Platonic Academy (especially Speusippus and Xenocrates), of the Peripatetic school (especially Aristotle, Aristoxenus, Theophrastus), of Stoicism (especially Chrysippus), of Middle Platonism (especially Alcinous, Maximus of Tyre, Philo) and of Neoplatonism (especially Plotinus, Porphyry). In medieval times the so-called method of divisio was a common method.
