= Theodorus of Cyrene =

5th century BC Greek mathematician

Theodorus of Cyrene (Ancient Greek: Θεόδωρος ὁ Κυρηναῖος, romanized: Theódōros ho Kyrēnaîos; fl. c. 450 BC) was an ancient Greek mathematician. The only first-hand accounts of him that survive are in three of Plato's dialogues: the Theaetetus, the Sophist, and the Statesman. In the first dialogue, he is said to have advanced a proof for the irrationality of the square roots $\sqrt3$ up to $\sqrt{17}$, which is often thought to have been the construction now known as the Spiral of Theodorus.

== Life ==
Little is known as Theodorus' biography beyond what can be inferred from Plato's dialogues. He was born in the northern African colony of Cyrene, and apparently taught both there and in Athens. He complains of old age in the Theaetetus, the dramatic date of 399 BC of which suggests his period of flourishing to have occurred in the mid-5th century. The text also associates him with the sophist Protagoras, with whom he claims to have studied before turning to geometry. A dubious tradition repeated among ancient biographers like Diogenes Laërtius held that Plato later studied with him in Cyrene, Libya. This eminent mathematician Theodorus was, along with Alcibiades and many other of Socrates' companions (many of whom would be associated with the Thirty Tyrants), accused of distributing the mysteries at a symposium, according to Plutarch, who himself was priest of the temple at Delphi.

== Work in mathematics ==
Theodorus' work is known through a sole theorem, which is delivered in the literary context of the Theaetetus and has been argued alternately to be historically accurate or fictional. In the text, his student Theaetetus attributes to him the theorem that the square roots of the non-square numbers up to 17 are irrational:

Theodorus here was drawing some figures for us in illustration of roots, showing that squares containing three square feet and five square feet are not commensurable in length with the unit of the foot, and so, selecting each one in its turn up to the square containing seventeen square feet and at that he stopped.

The square containing two square units is not mentioned, perhaps because the incommensurability of its side with the unit was already known.) Theodorus's method of proof is not known. It is not even known whether, in the quoted passage, "up to" (μέχρι) means that seventeen is included. If seventeen is excluded, then Theodorus's proof may have relied merely on considering whether numbers are even or odd. Indeed, Hardy and Wright and Knorr suggest proofs that rely ultimately on the following theorem: If $x^2=ny^2$ is soluble in integers, and $n$ is odd, then $n$ must be congruent to 1 modulo 8 (since $x$ and $y$ can be assumed odd, so their squares are congruent to 1 modulo 8. In one axiomatic specification of the arithmetic of even and odd numbers, it has been shown that it is not possible to prove the irrationality of the square root of 17. However, in a stronger such axiomatic system, the possibility of such a proof remains an open question.

A possibility suggested earlier by Zeuthen is that Theodorus applied the so-called Euclidean algorithm, formulated in Proposition X.2 of the Elements as a test for incommensurability. In modern terms, the theorem is that a real number with an infinite continued fraction expansion is irrational. Irrational square roots have periodic expansions. The period of the square root of 19 has length 6, which is greater than the period of the square root of any smaller number. The period of √17 has length one (so does √18; but the irrationality of √18 follows from that of √2).

The so-called Spiral of Theodorus is composed of contiguous right triangles with hypotenuse lengths equal √2, √3, √4, …, √17; additional triangles cause the diagram to overlap. Philip J. Davis interpolated the vertices of the spiral to get a continuous curve. He discusses the history of attempts to determine Theodorus' method in his book Spirals: From Theodorus to Chaos, and makes brief references to the matter in his fictional Thomas Gray series.

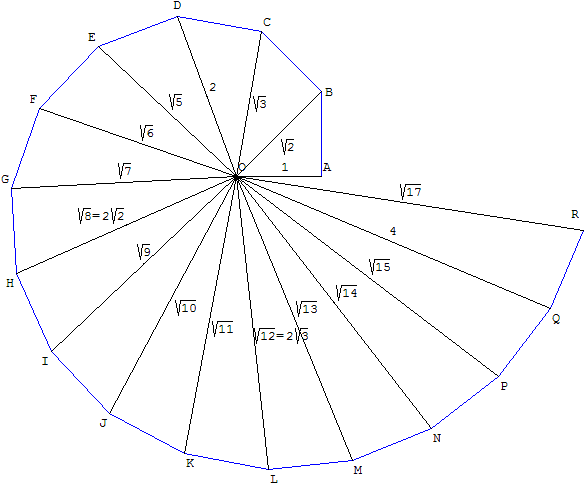
Spiral of Theodorus

That Theaetetus established a more general theory of irrationals, whereby square roots of non-square numbers are irrational, is suggested in the eponymous Platonic dialogue as well as commentary on, and scholia to, the Elements.

== See also ==
- Chronology of ancient Greek mathematicians
- List of speakers in Plato's dialogues
- Quadratic irrational
- Wilbur Knorr
