= Panionius of Chios =

Panionius of Chios (in Greek: Πανιώνιος) was a slave trader who lived in the late 6th to early 5th century BC, mentioned by the historian Herodotus as one of the first known named slave traders.

Originating from the island of Chios, Panionius bought young boys after castrating them, to resell them in Sardis, Ephesus, and the Persian-dominated region of Asia Minor. Hermotimus, one of the slaves he sold, later became the favorite eunuch of the Persian king Xerxes.

Herodotus recounts that while Xerxes was in Sardis preparing to attack Athens, Hermotimus visited the city of Atarneus in Mysia, which was farmed by people from Chios, and there he coincidentally met Panionius. Hermotimus showed him great kindness, "for all the good he had done to him", and promised a reward out of gratitude if he would come to his house with his entire family. Lured by these offers, Panionius went to Hermotimus with his wife and children. Once he had Panionius and his family in his power, he said:

Tell me, you who have made a livelihood out of the wickedest trade on earth, what harm had I or any of my forefathers done to you or yours, that you made me to be no man, but a thing of nought? You no doubt thought that the gods would have no knowledge of your former practices, but their just law has brought you for your wicked deeds into my hands. Now you will be well content with the fullness of that justice which I will execute upon you.

After these words, Hermotimus ordered Panionius's four children to be brought, and forced him to castrate them himself. Panionius, seeing no other choice, did so. Then, Hermotimus forced the children to perform the same operation on their own father. Thus, says Herodotus, Panionius was punished and Hermotimus took his revenge.

== Bibliography ==
- Herodotus. The Histories. A. D. Godley, Ed. Book VIII.
- Simon Hornblower, "Herodotus and his World: Essays from a Conference in Memory of George Forrest", in Peter Derow and Robert Parker (ed.), Oxford Academic
- Ove Strid. Voiceless Victims, Memorable Deaths in Herodotus. (2006) p. 393-403.
