= Protagoras =

Pre-Socratic Greek philosopher (c.490–c.420 BC)

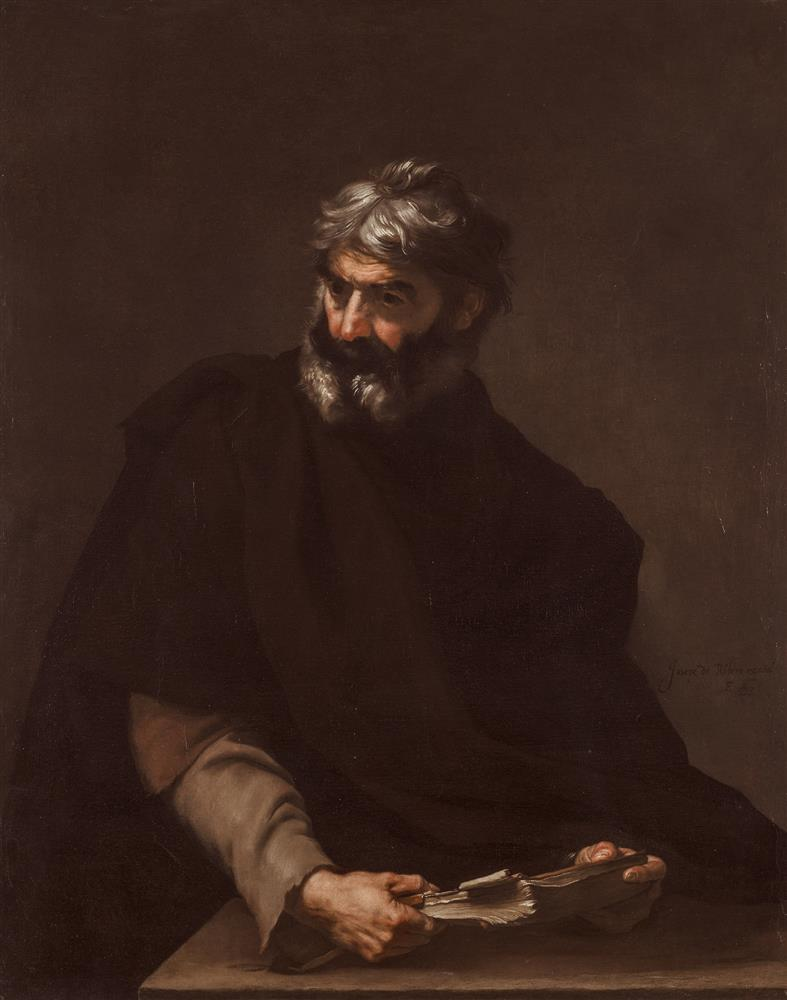
- Protagoras by Jusepe de Ribera, 1637
- Born: c. 490 BC; Abdera
- Died: c. 420 BC (aged c. 70)

Philosophical work
- Era: Pre-Socratic philosophy
- Region: Western philosophy
- School: Sophists
- Main interests: Language, semantics, rhetoric, agnosticism, ethics
- Notable ideas: Relativism; The "man measure" thesis

Protagoras (/proʊˈtæɡərəs, -æs/ proh-TAG-ər-əs, -ass; Greek: Πρωταγόρας; c. 490 BC – c. 420 BC) was a pre-Socratic Greek philosopher and rhetorical theorist. He is numbered as one of the sophists by Plato. In his dialogue Protagoras, Plato credits him with inventing the role of the professional sophist.

Protagoras is also believed to have created a major controversy during ancient times through his statement that "Of all things the measure is Man, of the things that are, that they are, and of the things that are not, that they are not" which was usually rendered simply as "Man is the measure of all things", interpreted by Plato to mean that there is no objective truth; Protagoras seems to have meant that each person's own personal history, experiences and expectations, developed over their lifetime, determine their judgments, opinions, and statements regarding "truth" (which is the title of the book in which Protagoras made this statement). When a person makes a judgment about a certain thing—good or bad or beautiful or unjust—that person will differ from other people's judgments because their experience has been different.

This concept of individual relativity was intended to be provocative; naturally, it was criticized by Plato and other philosophers, contrasting with both popular opinion and other philosophical doctrine that reality and its truth must have an objective grounding. However, it was part of Protagoras' point that the statement is somewhat counterintuitive. He argued that this concept—believing that others' opinions about the world are valid and must be respected, even if our own experience of truth is different—is necessary for a community to base itself and its decisions on open, democratic debate.

== Biography ==
Protagoras was born in Abdera, Thrace, opposite the island of Thasos, around 490 BC. According to Aulus Gellius, he originally made his living as a porter, but one day he was seen by the philosopher Democritus carrying a load of small pieces of wood he had tied with a short cord. Democritus realized that Protagoras had tied the load together with such perfect geometric accuracy that he must be a mathematical prodigy. Democritus promptly took him into his own household and taught him philosophy. Protagoras became well known in Athens and even became a friend of Pericles.

The dates of his life are not recorded but extrapolated from writings that have survived the ages. In Protagoras Plato wrote that, before a gathering of Socrates, Prodicus, and Hippias, Protagoras stated that he was old enough to be the father of any of them. This suggests a birth date of not later than 490 BC. In the Meno he is said to have died at approximately the age of 70, after 40 years as a practising Sophist. His death, then, may be presumed to have occurred circa 420 BC, but is not known for certain, since assumptions about it are based on an apparently fake story about his trial for asebeia (impiety) in Athens.

Plutarch wrote that Pericles and Protagoras spent a whole day discussing an interesting point of legal responsibility, that probably involved a more philosophical question of causation: "In an athletic contest, a man had been accidentally hit and killed with a javelin. Was his death to be attributed to the javelin, to the man who threw it, or to the authorities responsible for the conduct of the games?"

== Philosophy ==
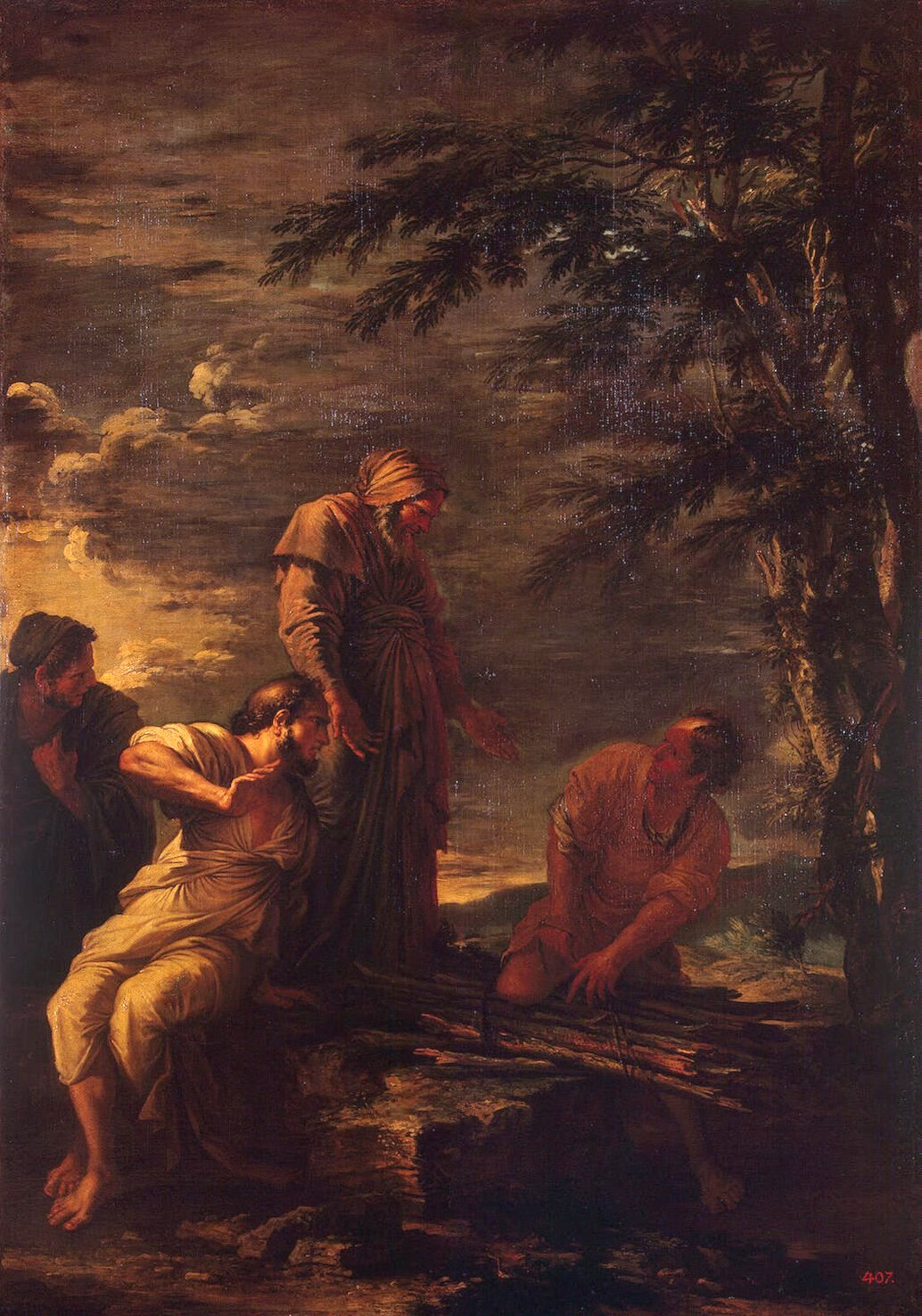
Democritus and Protagoras by Salvator Rosa; it is said that Protagoras was educated on philosophy by Democritus, but this is likely apocryphal.

Even though he was mentored by Democritus, Protagoras did not share his enthusiasm for the pursuit of mathematics. "For perceptible lines are not the kind of things the geometer talks about, since no perceptible thing is straight or curved in that way, nor is a circle tangent to a ruler at a point, but the way Protagoras used to say in refuting the geometers" (Aristotle, Metaphysics 997b34–998a4). Protagoras was skeptical about the application of theoretical mathematics to the natural world; he did not believe they were really worth studying at all. According to Philodemus, Protagoras said that "The subject matter is unknowable and the terminology distasteful". Nonetheless, mathematics was considered to be by some a very viable form of art, and Protagoras says on the arts, "art (tekhnê) without practice and practice without art are nothing" (Stobaeus, Selections 3.29.80).

Protagoras taught subjects related to virtue and political life. He especially was involved in the question of whether virtue could be taught, a commonplace issue of fifth century BC Greece, that has been related to modern readers through Plato's dialogues like Meno and Phaedo. Rather than educators who offered specific, practical training in rhetoric or public speaking, Protagoras attempted to formulate a reasoned understanding, on a very general level, of a wide range of human phenomena, including language and education. In Plato's Protagoras, he claims to teach "the proper management of one's own affairs, how best to run one's household, and the management of public affairs, how to make the most effective contribution to the affairs of the city by word and action".

He also seems to have had an interest in "orthoepeia"—the correct use of words—although this topic is more strongly associated with his fellow sophist Prodicus. In his eponymous Platonic dialogue, Protagoras interprets a poem by Simonides, focusing on the use of words, their literal meaning, and the author's original intent. This type of education would have been useful for the interpretation of laws and other written documents in the Athenian courts. Diogenes Laërtius reports that Protagoras devised a taxonomy of speech acts, such as assertion, question, answer, command, etc. Aristotle also says that Protagoras worked on the classification and proper use of grammatical gender.

The titles of his books, such as Technique of Eristics (Technē Eristikōn, literally "Practice of Wranglings"—wrestling used as a metaphor for intellectual debate), prove that Protagoras also was a teacher of rhetoric and argumentation. Diogenes Laërtius states that he was one of the first to take part in rhetorical contests in the Olympic games.

Eusebius quoting Aristocles of Messene says that Protagoras was a member of a line of philosophy that began with Xenophanes and culminated in Pyrrhonism.

=== Relativism ===
Protagoras also said that on any matter, there are two arguments (logoi) opposed to one another. Consequently, he may have been the author of Dissoi logoi, an ancient Sophistic text on such opposing arguments. According to Aristotle, Protagoras was criticized for having claimed "to make the weaker argument stronger" (ton hēttō logon kreittō poiein).

Protagoras is credited with the philosophy of relativism, which he discussed in his lost work, Truth (also known as Refutations). Although knowledge of Protagoras' position is limited, his relativism is inferred from one of his most famous statements: "Man is the measure of all things: of the things that are, that they are, of the things that are not, that they are not."

Protagoras appears to have meant that each individual is the measure of how things are perceived by that individual. Therefore, things are, or are not, true according to how the individual perceives them. For example, Person X may believe that the weather is cold, whereas Person Y may believe that the weather is hot. According to the philosophy of Protagoras, there is no absolute evaluation of the nature of a temperature because the evaluation will be relative to who is perceiving it. Therefore, to Person X, the weather is cold, whereas to Person Y, the weather is hot. This philosophy implies that there are no absolute "truths". The truth, according to Protagoras, is relative, and differs according to each individual.

Plato ascribes relativism to Protagoras and uses his character Socrates as a foil for his own commitment to objective and transcendent realities and values. Plato ascribes to Protagoras an early form of what John Wild categorized as phenomenalism. That being an assertion that something that is, or appears for a single individual, is true or real for that individual. However, as described in Plato's Theaetetus, Protagoras's views allow that some views may result from an ill body or mind. He stressed that although all views may appear equally true, and perhaps, should be equally respected, they certainly are not of equal gravity. One view may be useful and advantageous to the person who has it, while the perception of another may prove harmful. Hence, Protagoras believed that the sophist was there to teach the student how to discriminate between them, i.e., to teach virtue.

Both Plato and Aristotle argue against some of Protagoras's claims regarding relativity; however, they argue that the concept provides Protagoras with too convenient an exemption from his own theory and that relativism is true for him yet false for those who do not believe it. They claim that by asserting that truth is relative, Protagoras then could say that whatever further theory he proposed must be true.

=== Agnosticism ===
Protagoras was a proponent of either agnosticism or, as Tim Whitmarsh claims, atheism, on the grounds that since he held that if something is not able to be known it does not exist. Reportedly, in Protagoras's lost work, On the Gods, he wrote: "Concerning the gods, I have no means of knowing whether they exist or not, nor of what sort they may be, because of the obscurity of the subject, and the brevity of human life."

According to Diogenes Laërtius, the outspoken, agnostic position taken by Protagoras aroused anger, causing the Athenians to expel him from the city, and all copies of his book were collected and burned in the marketplace. The deliberate destruction of his works is also mentioned by Cicero. The classicist John Burnet doubts this account, however, as both Diogenes Laërtius and Cicero wrote hundreds of years later and as no such persecution of Protagoras is mentioned by contemporaries who make extensive references to this philosopher. Burnet notes that even if some copies of the Protagoras books were burned, enough of them survived to be known and discussed in the following century.

=== Spectrum of topics ===
Nonetheless, very few fragments from Protagoras have survived, although he is known to have written several different works: Antilogiae and Truth. The latter is cited by Plato, and was known alternatively as, The Throws (a wrestling term referring to the attempt to floor an opponent). It began with the "Man is the measure" (ἄνθρωπος μέτρον) pronouncement. According to Diogenes Laërtius other books by Protagoras include: On the Gods, Art of Eristics, Imperative, On Ambition, On Incorrect Human Actions, On Those in Hades, On Sciences, On Virtues, On the Original State of Things and Trial over a Fee.

== See also ==
- Paradox of the Court
