= Hermotimus of Clazomenae =

Pre-Socratic Greek philosopher

Hermotimus of Clazomenae (Greek: Ἑρμότιμος; fl. c. 8th or 7th century BCE), was a possibly historic or legendary Presocratic philosopher about whom many legendary feats were ascribed in antiquity, including the ability for his soul to leave his body and travel around. Some ancient sources also considered him a previous reincarnation of Pythagoras. Aristotle also credited him with some of the metaphysical doctrines on Nous that were more commonly attributed to Anaxagoras.

== Historicity ==
The best evidence for Hermotimus' potential historical existence is a tradition that the people of Clazomenae erected a temple for him, which is related by Pliny the Elder, Lucian, Apollonius, and Plutarch.

== Philosophical views ==
According to Aristotle, prior to Anaxagoras' idea of mind being fundamental in the cause of change, Hermotimus proposed that physical entities are static, while reason causes the change. Sextus Empiricus places him with Hesiod, Parmenides, and Empedocles, as belonging to the class of philosophers who held a dualistic theory of a material and an active principle being together the origin of the universe. Lucian called him a Pythagorean.

== Legends ==
Diogenes Laërtius records a story that Pythagoras remembered his earlier lives, one being Hermotimus, who had validated his own claim to recall earlier lives by recognizing the decaying shield of Menelaus in the temple of Apollo at Didyma. Tertullian relates a story about Hermotimus, in which Hermotimus' soul would depart his body during sleep, as if on a trip. His wife betrayed the oddity and his enemies came and burned his body while he was asleep, his soul returning too late.
