= Statesman (dialogue) =

Socratic dialogue written by Plato

The Statesman (Ancient Greek: Πολιτικός, Politikós; Latin: Politicus), also known by its Latin title, Politicus, is a Socratic dialogue written by Plato. The text depicts a conversation among Socrates, the mathematician Theodorus, another person named Socrates (referred to as Socrates the Younger), and an unnamed philosopher from Elea referred to as "the Stranger" (ξένος, xénos). It is ostensibly an attempt to arrive at a definition of "statesman", as opposed to "sophist" or "philosopher", and is presented as following the action of the Sophist dialogue.

The Sophist had begun with the question of whether the sophist, statesman, and philosopher were one or three, leading the Eleatic Stranger to argue that they were three but that this could only be ascertained through full accounts of each (Sophist 217b). But though Plato has his characters give accounts of the sophist and statesman in their respective dialogues, it is most likely that he never wrote a dialogue about the philosopher.

== Contents ==
The dialogue begins immediately after the Sophist ends, with Socrates (the elder) and Theodorus briefly reflecting on the discussion before the Eleatic Stranger proposes to begin a dialectical investigation with Socrates the Younger into the nature of the statesman. The Eleatic Stranger and Socrates the Younger resume using the method of division employed in the Sophist, pausing to reflect on dialectical methods and a myth similar to the myth of ages. The interlocutors ultimately offer a complicated account of the statesman through a version of division that entails accounting for the object of inquiry 'by carving at the joints' like a 'sacrificial animal' (Statesman 287b–c).

== Interpretations ==
According to John M. Cooper, the dialogue was intended to clarify that to rule or have political power called for a specialized knowledge. The statesman was one who possesses this special knowledge of how to rule justly and well and to have the best interests of the citizens at heart. It is presented that politics should be run by this knowledge, or gnosis. This claim runs counter to those who, the Stranger points out, actually did rule. Those that rule merely give the appearance of such knowledge, but in the end are really sophists or imitators. For, as the Stranger maintains, a sophist is one who does not know the right thing to do, but only appears to others as someone who does. The Stranger's ideal of how one arrives at this knowledge of power is through social divisions. The Stranger takes great pains to be very specific about where and why the divisions are needed in order to teach the proper method of dialectics and to convince Young Socrates that there is such a science (techne) of governance (politike).

== Myth of Cronos ==
In order to correct a division made in search of the "Statesman," the Eleatic Stranger tells the story of how, during the Age of Cronos (prior to the current Age of Zeus), humans were born from the earth and lived leisurely lives opposite to the ones familiar today (Stephanus Pages 269-275). In that age the gods provided for humans directly as their caretakers, as opposed to the current Age in which the gods only periodically deliver instructions (e.g. Prometheus' gift of fire) but otherwise are not directly involved with humans. The current Age thus naturally devolves away from the divine instructions as humans rely more and more on themselves and so, its statesmen are consequentially more human than divine.

== The Paradigm of Weaving ==
The Stranger proposes that the use of paradigm can help to see a connection between two things, one recognized and one not. Learning words through the recognition of common letters and phrases is presented as utilizing paradigm and the art of Weaving is suggested as similarly helpful in arriving at the "Statesman." The act of Weaving is then used to separate the science (Episteme) of Statesmanship (politike) from all other professions that imitate it and contend with it for legitimacy. Just as there are many skills that support the act of Weaving (e.g. carding, tool-making, spinning, etc.) the act of Weaving is the primary, as opposed to the contingent, cause(s) of the woven object. In the same way, the Stranger separates out the contingent causes for a well-governed society from all the skills that support it in a contingent but not primary way. The Statesman is shown directing all of these other skills (e.g. public speaking, military strategy, penal jurisprudence: 304 A) when and where they should apply.

The paradigm of Weaving is employed a second time in order to describe one particular skill that the Statesman must employ in order to create a well-governed society. Here, the Stranger points out two virtuous character types that do not naturally work well with each other: the courageous (andreias: quickness, speed, poignancy) and the cautious deliberative (sophrosune: controlled, still, quiet, gentle, orderly, careful) types. The Statesman forges two bonds between these two types so that they work together for the benefit of society. The first bond consists of a common opinion about honor, justice, goodness and their opposites. The second bond is a social structure that encourages intermarriage (310 A) and professional teamwork. Without these bonds, each type isolates and becomes excessive, producing savage impulsive citizens on one hand, and uninvolved pacifists on the other (307 E).

== Texts and translations ==
- Greek text at Perseus
- Plato: Statesman, Philebus, Ion. Greek with translation by Harold N. Fowler and W. R. M. Lamb. Loeb Classical Library 164. Harvard Univ. Press (originally published 1925). ISBN 978-0674991828 HUP listing
- Fowler translation at Perseus
- Jowett translation with introduction at StandardEbooks
- Plato. Opera, volume I. Oxford Classical Texts. ISBN 978-0198145691
- Plato. Complete Works. Ed. J. M. Cooper and D. S. Hutchinson. Hackett, 1997. ISBN 978-0872203495

== See also ==
- Philosophical analysis
