= Eleatics =

Pre-Socratic school of philosophy

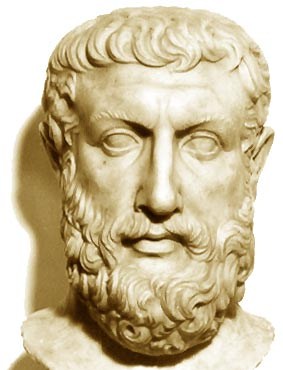
Bust of Parmenides, considered to be the founder of Eleatic philosophy

The Eleatics were a group of pre-Socratic philosophers and school of thought in the 5th century BC centered around the ancient Greek colony of Elea (Ancient Greek: Ἐλέα), located around 80 miles south-east of Naples in southern Italy, then known as Magna Graecia.

The primary philosophers who are associated with the Eleatic doctrines are Parmenides, Zeno of Elea, and Melissus of Samos, although other Italian philosophers such as Xenophanes of Colophon and Empedocles have also sometimes been classified as members of this movement. The Eleatics have traditionally been seen as advocating a strict metaphysical view of monism in response to the materialist monism advocated by their predecessors, the Ionian school.

== History ==
The chronology of pre-Socratic philosophers is one of the most contentious issues of pre-Socratic philosophy. Many of the historical details mentioned by Plato, Diogenes Laertius, or Apollodorus are generally considered by modern scholarship to be of little value, and there are generally few exact dates that can be verified, so most estimates of dates and relative chronology must rely on interpretations of the internal evidence within the surviving fragments.

There is generally a consensus that Parmenides lived in the early 5th century BC, based on the date and setting of the fictionalized events in Plato's Parmenides where Parmenides and Zeno travel to Athens and have a debate with a young Socrates. This would place Parmenides well after other philosophers such as Xenophanes, Heraclitus, and Pythagoras. Although many philosophers throughout history have interpreted the doctrines of the Eleatics as responses to Xenophanes, Heraclitus, or Pythagoras, there is no broad agreement or direct evidence of any influence or direct response, although many theories have been put forth interpreting the Eleatics in terms of these philosophers. For philosophers after Parmenides, however, the relative chronology and potential directions of influence become even more difficult to determine.

For Zeno, it is not clear whether or not Anaxagoras or Empedocles influenced or were influenced by any of his ideas, although they appear to have lived at approximately the same time. For Melissus, who lived one generation later, the problem of influence is further complicated by additional potential influences of Leucippus, Democritus, and Diogenes of Apollonia. For example, some interpreters see Melissus as responding to Leucippus' atomism, which is then responded to by Democritus - but others see Melissus responding to Democritus.

== Philosophy ==
=== The One ===
The Eleatics believed in the oneness of the universe, and that "All is One". To justify this view, Parmenides argued that everything either "is" or "is not". Since "is not" doesn't truly exist, this means only "what is" can actually exist, and everything must fall under this one category. In Empedocles' poem On Nature, wrote:

Come now, I will tell thee—and do thou hearken to my saying and carry it away—the only two ways of search that can be thought of. The first, namely, that It is, and that it is impossible for it not to be, is the way of belief, for truth is its companion. The other, namely, that It is not, and that it must needs not be,—that, I tell thee, is a path that none can learn of at all. For thou canst not know what is not —that is impossible—nor utter it; for it is the same thing that can be thought and that can be.

This concept was further expanded upon by Melissus of Samos, who was one of the first philosophers to champion the principle that nothing can come from nothing, and that a first cause was necessary for the universe to exist. He believed that this first cause (called "The One") had to be both eternal and infinite, and that because it is infinite it also cannot be divided into parts, as that would require those parts having to establish finite boundaries in relation to each other. Since The One is already whole it can't change in any way, shape or form.

=== Motion ===
Because the Eleatics thought that The One doesn't undergo any changes, they rejected the possibility of motion existing. They believed that any perceived motion was due to illusions of the senses, which are incapable of understanding the universal unity. They thus rejected empirical evidence in favour of strict adherence to reason.

=== Creation ===
The Eleatics argued that there can be no creation, for being cannot come from non-being, because a thing cannot arise from that which is different from it. They argued that errors on this point commonly arise from the ambiguous use of the verb to be, which may imply actual physical existence or be merely the linguistic copula which connects subject and predicate.

=== Zeno's paradoxes ===
Zeno of Elea employed various reductio ad absurdum paradoxes in order to disprove the concept of motion, attempting to destroy the arguments of others by showing that their premises led to contradictions (see: Zeno's paradoxes).

== Legacy ==
One of the characters in Plato's Sophist is "an Eleatic stranger"; Plato also acknowledged the Eleatics in the Parmenides and the Statesman. Some authors suggest that Meno's paradox, in Plato's dialogue Meno, can be linked to the Eleatic distinction between "knowing" and "not-knowing".

== Sources ==
- Boyer, Carl B.; Merzbach, Uta C. (2011). A History of Mathematics (Third ed.). Hoboken, New Jersey: John Wiley & Sons. pp. 67–68. ISBN 978-0-470-52548-7.
- Curd, Patricia (2004). The legacy of Parmenides : Eleatic monism and later presocratic thought. Las Vegas, Nev.: Parmenides Publishing. ISBN 1-930972-15-6.
- Andre Laks; Glenn W. Most, eds. (2016). "Western Greek Thinkers, Part 2". Loeb Classical Library. Early Greek Philosophy. Vol. 528. Cambridge, Massachusetts: Harvard University Press. ISBN 978-0-674-99706-6.
- Palmer, John Anderson (2009). Parmenides and Presocratic philosophy. Oxford: Oxford University Press. ISBN 9780199567904.
