= Hermotimus of Pedasa =

Xerxes' chief eunuch

Hermotimus of Pedasa (Greek: Ἑρμότιμος) was Xerxes the Great's favored royal eunuch during the Persian Wars against Greece (480 BC).

As a eunuch, not much factually is known about Hermotimus, because he was not as important to contemporary historians. Anecdotes still survive regarding the castration of Panionius in the winter of 481–480 BC, the same man who castrated Hermotimus and sold him as a boy. Hermotimus forced Panionius to castrate his sons, and then forced his sons to castrate him, proving his ruthlessness and lack of passion that he was to show in the Persian Wars the following autumn.

After the loss at the Battle of Salamis, Xerxes made Hermotimus the secondary guardian of some of the king's many illegitimate children, a role generally reserved for kings. After the end of the campaign, all record of Hermotimus disappears. It is likely that he lived out his life in the service of Xerxes and possibly Artaxerxes as a faithful eunuch.
