= Parmenides =

5th-century BC Greek philosopher

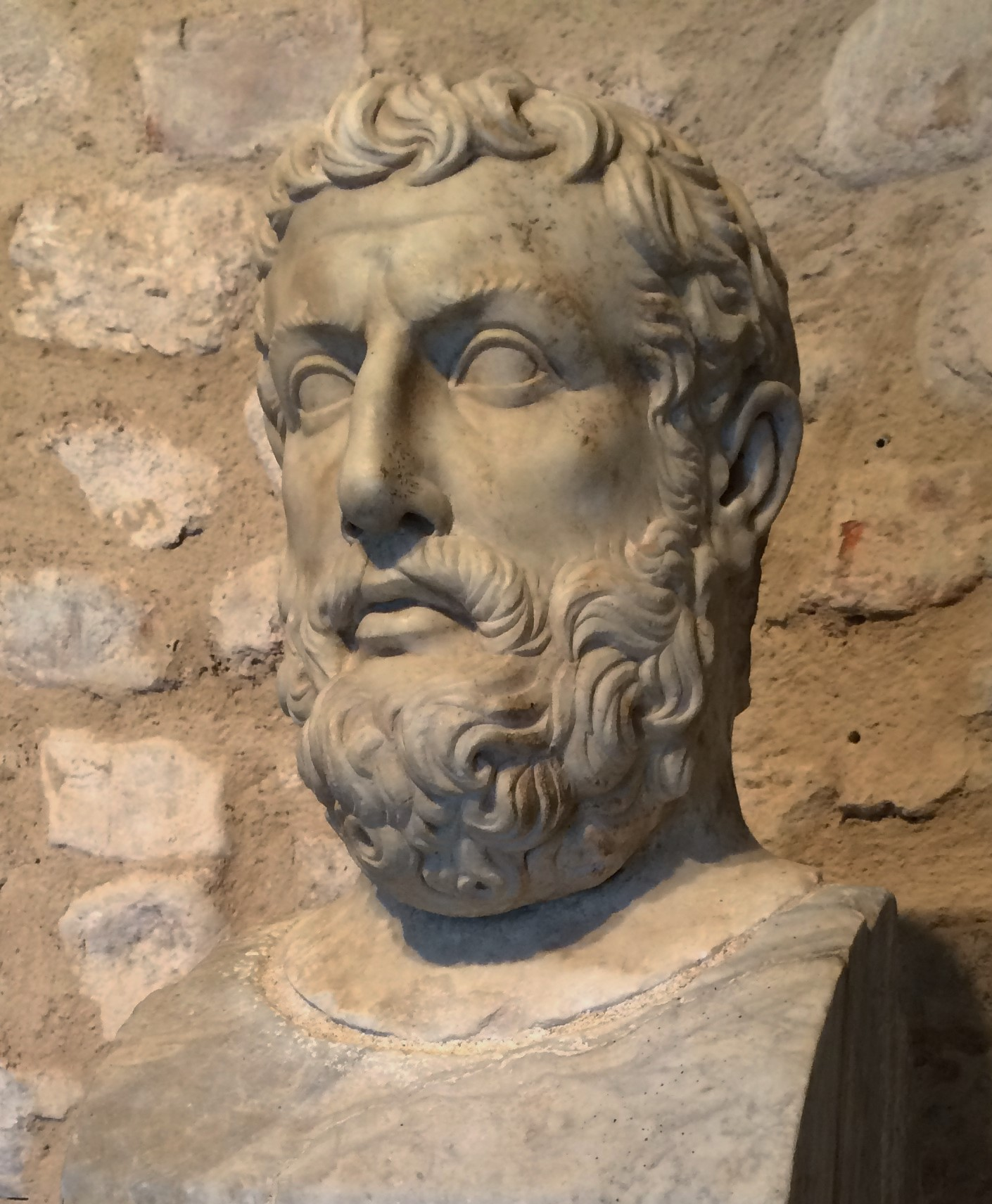
- Bust of Parmenides discovered at Velia, thought to have been partially modeled on a Metrodorus bust
- Born: c. late 6th century BC; Elea, Magna Graecia
- Died: c. 5th century BC

Philosophical work
- Era: Pre-Socratic philosophy
- Region: Western philosophy
- School: Eleatic school
- Main interests: Ontology, poetry, cosmology
- Notable ideas: Monism, truth/opinion distinction

Parmenides of Elea (/pɑːrˈmɛnɪdiːz ... ˈɛliə/; Ancient Greek: Παρμενίδης ὁ Ἐλεάτης; fl. late sixth or early fifth century BC) was a pre-Socratic Greek philosopher from Elea in Magna Graecia (Southern Italy).

Parmenides was born in the Greek colony of Elea to a wealthy and illustrious family. (Note: Diogenes Laërtius, (DK 28A1, 21)) The exact date of his birth is not known with certainty; on the one hand, according to the doxographer Diogenes Laërtius, Parmenides flourished in the period immediately preceding 500 BC, (Note: Diogenes Laërtius (DK 28A1, 23)) which would place his year of birth around 540 BC; on the other hand, in the dialogue Parmenides Plato portrays him as visiting Athens at the age of 65, when Socrates was a young man, c. 450 BC, (Note: Plato, Parmenides, 127a–128b (DK 28A5)) which, if true, suggests a potential year of birth of c. 515 BC. Parmenides is thought to have been in his prime (or "floruit") around 475 BC.

The single known work by Parmenides is a philosophical poem in dactylic hexameter verse whose original title is unknown but which is often referred to as On Nature. Only fragments of it survive, but the integrity of the poem is remarkably higher than what has come down to us from the works of almost all other pre-Socratic philosophers, and therefore classicists can reconstruct the philosophical doctrines with greater precision. In his poem, Parmenides prescribes two views of reality. The first, the way of "Aletheia" or truth, describes how all reality is one, change is impossible, and existence is timeless and uniform. The second view, the way of "Doxa" or opinion, describes the world of appearances, in which one's sensory faculties lead to conceptions that are false and deceitful.

Parmenides has been considered the founder of ontology and has, through his influence on Plato, influenced the whole history of Western philosophy. He is also considered to be the founder of the Eleatic school of philosophy, which also included Zeno of Elea and Melissus of Samos. Zeno's paradoxes of motion were developed to defend Parmenides's views. In contemporary philosophy, Parmenides's work has remained relevant in debates about the philosophy of time.

== Biography ==
Parmenides was born in Elea to an aristocratic family. Diogenes Laertius says that his father was Pires. Laertius transmits two divergent sources regarding the teacher of the philosopher. One, dependent on Sotion, indicates that he was first a student of Xenophanes, but did not follow him, and later became associated with a Pythagorean, Aminias, whom he preferred as his teacher. Another tradition, dependent on Theophrastus, indicates that he was a disciple of Anaximander.

=== Chronology ===
Parmenides was one of the pre-Socratic philosophers. As with all pre-Socratic philosophers, the little known about his life and work comes from writings and quotations by later philosophers. Parmenides founded his school of thought in Elea. His ideas were followed by Melissus of Samos and Zeno of Elea, with the latter being a close friend of Parmenides.

==== Date of birth ====
All conjectures regarding Parmenides's date of birth are based on two ancient sources. One comes from Apollodorus and is transmitted to us by Diogenes Laertius: this source marks the Olympiad 69th (between 504 BC and 500 BC) as the moment of maturity, placing his birth 40 years earlier (544 BC – 540 BC). The other is Plato, in his dialogue Parmenides. There Plato composes a situation in which Parmenides, 65, and Zeno, 40, travel to Athens to attend the Panathenaic Games. On that occasion they meet Socrates, who was still very young according to the Platonic text.

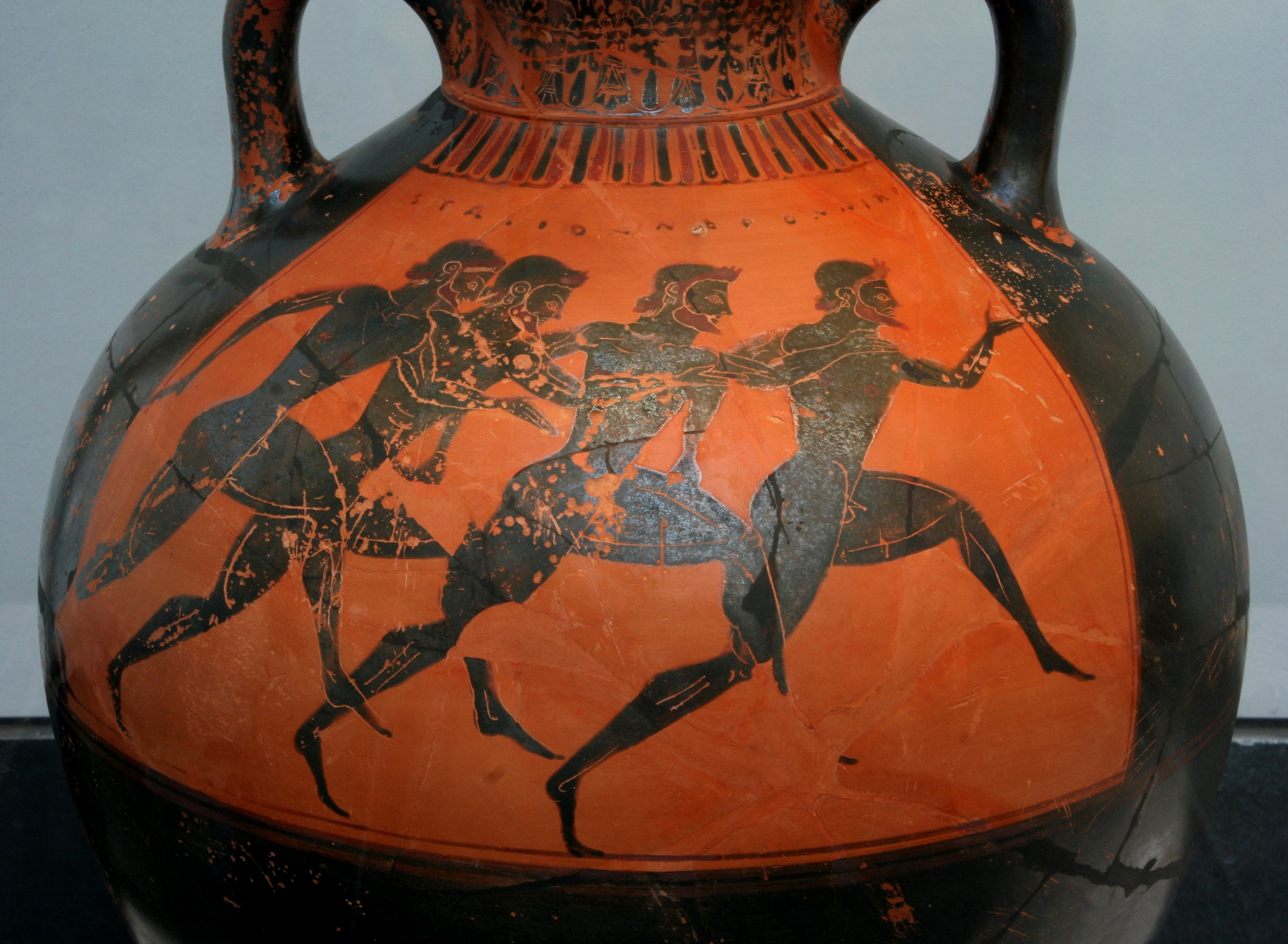
Greek vase with runners at the panathenaic games, c. 530 BC. In Plato's [fictional] dialogue, Parmenides and Zeno debate a young Socrates during these games c. 450 BC.

The inaccuracy of the dating from Apollodorus is well known, who chooses the date of a historical event to make it coincide with the maturity (the floruit) of a philosopher, a maturity that he invariably reached at forty years of age. He tries to always match the maturity of a philosopher with the birth of his alleged disciple. In this case Apollodorus, according to Burnet, based his date of the foundation of Elea (540 BC) to chronologically locate the maturity of Xenophanes and thus the birth of his supposed disciple, Parmenides. Knowing this, Burnet and later classicists like Cornford, Raven, Guthrie, and Schofield preferred to base the calculations on the Platonic dialogue. According to the latter, the fact that Plato adds so much detail regarding ages in his text is a sign that he writes with chronological precision. Plato says that Socrates was very young, and this is interpreted to mean that he was less than twenty years old. We know the year of Socrates's death (399 BC) and his age—he was about seventy years old—making the date of his birth 469 BC. The Panathenaic games were held every four years, and of those held during Socrates's youth (454, 450, 446), the most likely is that of 450 BC, when Socrates was nineteen years old. Thus, if at this meeting Parmenides was about sixty-five years old, his birth occurred around 515 BC.

However, neither Raven nor Schofield, who follows the former, finds a dating based on a late Platonic dialogue entirely satisfactory. Other scholars directly prefer not to use the Platonic testimony and propose other dates. According to a scholar of the Platonic dialogues, R. Hirzel, Conrado Eggers Lan indicates that the historical has no value for Plato. The fact that the meeting between Socrates and Parmenides is mentioned in the dialogues Theaetetus (183e) and Sophist (217c) only indicates that it is referring to the same fictional event, and this is possible because both the Theaetetus and the Sophist are considered after the Parmenides. In Soph. 217c the dialectic procedure of Socrates is attributed to Parmenides, which would confirm that this is nothing more than a reference to the fictitious dramatic situation of the dialogue. Eggers Lan proposes a correction of the traditional date of the foundation of Elea. Based on Herodotus I, 163–167, which indicates that the Phocians, after defeating the Carthaginians in naval battle, founded Elea, and adding the reference to Thucydides I, 13, where it is indicated that such a battle occurred in the time of Cambyses II, the foundation of Elea can be placed between 530 BC and 522 BC So Parmenides could not have been born before 530 BC or after 520 BC, given that it predates Empedocles. This last dating procedure is not infallible either, because it has been questioned that the fact that links the passages of Herodotus and Thucydides is the same. Nestor Luis Cordero also rejects the chronology based on the Platonic text, and the historical reality of the encounter, in favor of the traditional date of Apollodorus. He follows the traditional datum of the founding of Elea in 545 BC, pointing to it not only as terminus post quem, but as a possible date of Parmenides's birth, from which he concludes that his parents were part of the founding contingent of the city and that he was a contemporary of Heraclitus.

==== Timeline relative to other Presocratics ====
Parmenides would have been familiar with previous philosophers, such as the Milesians, as well as writers such as Homer and Hesiod. He may have known a Pythagorean philosopher, Ameinias, who introduced him to philosophy. Parmenides is sometimes described as beginning his study in the Milesian school under the tutelage of Anaximenes. He may alternatively have been a student of Xenophanes. Plato said that Parmenides traveled to Athens in 450 BCE, where he interacted with Socrates in the latter's youth.

Rather than attempt to estimate Parmenides' chronology from ancient testimony, some scholars have turned directly to passages in his work to determine which other presocratic philosophers he may have influenced, and which philosophers may have been reacting to his doctrines, and working backwards to get a better estimate of the time in which he lived, including allusions to the doctrine of Anaximenes and the Pythagoreans (fragment B 8, verse 24, and frag. B 4), and also against Heraclitus (frag .B 6, vv.8–9), while Empedocles and Anaxagoras frequently refer to Parmenides. The Atomist doctrines of are also seen as reactions to the doctrines of the later Eleatics who followed Parmenides. However, the philosopher whose potential influence has provoked the most discussion is Heraclitus of Ephesus.(frag .B 6, vv.8–9)

The potential references to Heraclitus in Parmenides work have been debated. Bernays's thesis that Parmenides attacks Heraclitus, to which Diels, Kranz, Gomperz, Burnet and others adhered. However, at the same time Karl Reinhardt postulates his thesis of chronological inversion: Heraclitus would be posterior to Parmenides, so the passage could not have objected to the doctrine of that one. Werner Jaeger followed suit on this point: he believes that the goddess's criticism is addressed to all mortals. Although Heraclitus criticized other philosophers such as Xenophanes and Pythagoras, he does not include Parmenides in this list. Guthrie finds it surprising that Heraclitus would not have censured Parmenides if he had known him. His conclusion, however, does not arise from this consideration, but points out that, due to the importance of his thought, Parmenides splits the history of pre-Socratic philosophy in two, therefore his position with respect to other thinkers it is easy to determine. And, from this point of view, the philosophy of Heraclitus seems to him pre-Parmenidean, while those of Empedocles, Anaxagoras and Democritus are post-Parmenidean. The evidence also suggests that Parmenides could not have written much after the death of Heraclitus. Regardless of the acceptance or rejection of the chronological inversion, Guthrie also leans by this interpretation, but with important nuances: the goddess refers, effectively, to all mortals. However, Heraclitus could be exceptionally representative of the "judgmentless multitude" (ἄκριτα φῦλα v. 7), since the error that characterizes these is based on reliance on the eyes and ears (B 7, v. 4); and Heraclitus preferred the visible to the audible (22 B 55). He adds that the Heraclitean assertions “wills and does not will” (22 B 32), “on diverging converges” (22 B 51), “on changing is at rest” (22 B 84a) “evidence of the quintessence of what Parmenides deplores here». In light of this accumulation of evidence, he points out, it is for this reason that what many have seen as the only unequivocal reference to Heraclitus (22 B 51) in verse 9 of fr. 6. “Where no isolated sentence provides conviction, the cumulative effect may be of vital importance.”

=== Anecdotes ===
Parmenides worked in government, as was common for pre-Socratic philosophers. Plutarch, Strabo and Diogenes—following the testimony of Speusippus—agree that Parmenides participated in the government of his city, organizing it and giving it a code of admirable laws.

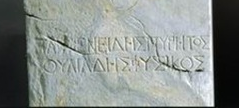
Detail of the pedestal found in Velia. Greek inscriptions were made only in capital letters, and without spaces. Read as follows: ΠΑ[ ]ΜΕΝΕΙΔΗΣ ΠΥΡΗΤΟΣ ΟΥΛΙΑΔΗΣ ΦΥΣΙΚΟΣ

==== Archaeological discovery ====
In 1969, the plinth of a statue dated to the 1st century AD was excavated in Velia. On the plinth were four words: ΠΑ[Ρ]ΜΕΝΕΙΔΗΣ ΠΥΡΗΤΟΣ ΟΥΛΙΑΔΗΣ ΦΥΣΙΚΟΣ. The first two clearly read "Parmenides, son of Pires." The fourth word φυσικός (fysikós, "physicist") was commonly used to designate philosophers who devoted themselves to the observation of nature. On the other hand, there is no agreement on the meaning of the third (οὐλιάδης, ouliadēs): it can simply mean "a native of Elea" (the name "Velia" is in Greek Οὐέλια), or "belonging to the Οὐλιος" (Ulios), that is, to a medical school (the patron of which was Apollo Ulius). If this last hypothesis were true, then Parmenides would be, in addition to being a legislator, a doctor. The hypothesis is reinforced by the ideas contained in fragment 18 of his poem, which contains anatomical and physiological observations. However, other specialists believe that the only certainty we can extract from the discovery is that of the social importance of Parmenides in the life of his city, already indicated by the testimonies that indicate his activity as a legislator.

==== Visit to Athens ====
Plato, in his dialogue Parmenides, relates that, accompanied by his disciple Zeno of Elea, Parmenides visited Athens when he was approximately sixty-five years old and that, on that occasion, Socrates, then a young man, conversed with him. Athenaeus of Naucratis had noted that, although the ages make a dialogue between Parmenides and Socrates hardly possible, the fact that Parmenides has sustained arguments similar to those sustained in the Platonic dialogue is something that seems impossible. Most modern classicists consider the visit to Athens and the meeting and conversation with Socrates to be fictitious. Allusions to this visit in other Platonic works are only references to the same fictitious dialogue and not to a historical fact.

== Philosophy ==
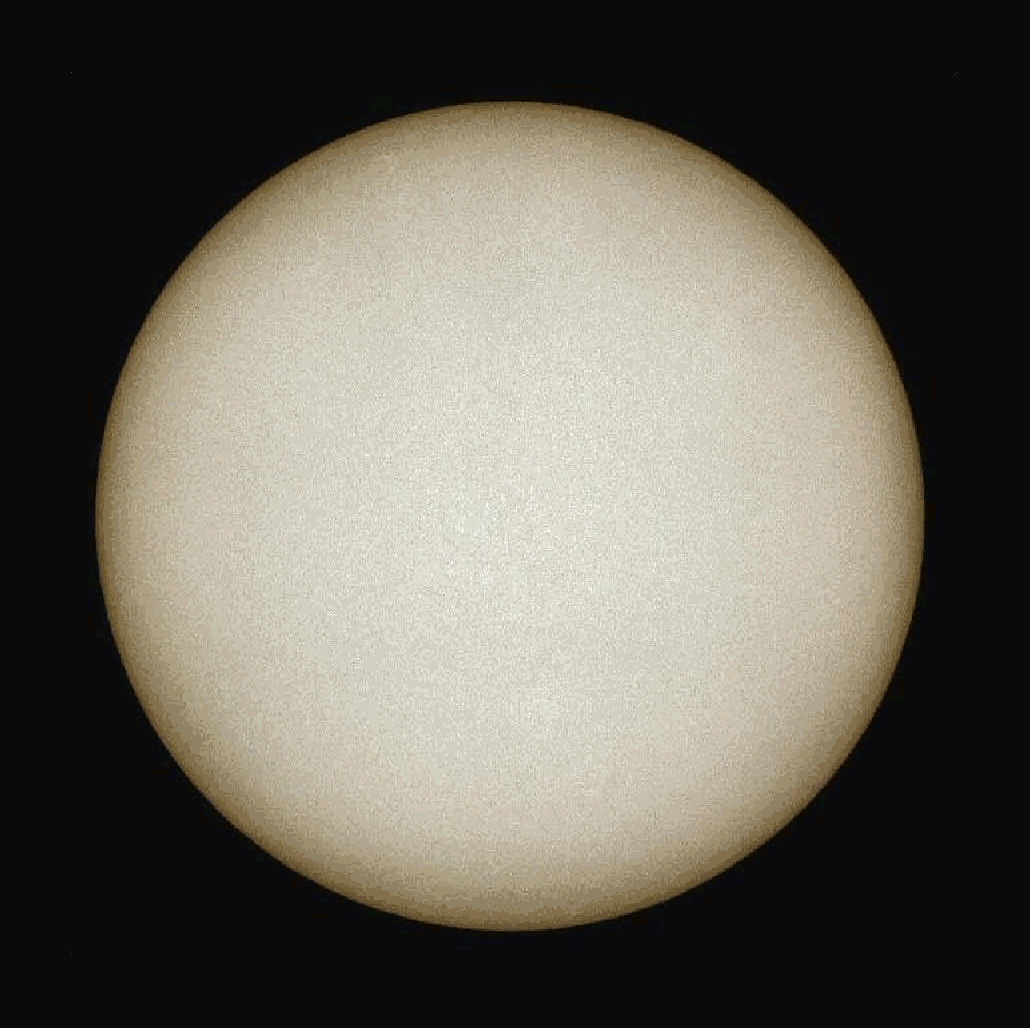
A modern diagram representing Parmenides's conception of Being as a unified, unchanging sphere.

=== Epistemology ===
Parmenides depicted his philosophy as a divine truth, and rejected the evidence of the senses, believing that truth could only be found through reason. However, he considered both the divine and mortal understandings worth learning, as mortal understandings can still carry meaning. As mortals think through their senses, Parmenides held that it is impossible for them to understand Being in its true form without distortion. By naming each concept, humans have distorted the uniform nature of Being and created concepts of things that are neither consistent Being nor non-Being. It is this simultaneous belief that forms the opinions of men. Being holds the same properties as and is indistinguishable from the concept of truth, as it is self-contained, unchanging, and eternal. Being is perceived in the mind, not through the senses. To apprehend something means that it must be something and not nothing and is therefore Being. Perceiving in the mind is distinct from thinking about something, as thinking pertains to specific objects that would divide Being.

=== Ontology ===
Parmenides rejected the existence of non-Being, as something cannot be nothing. He defined all things that can be thought or spoken of as Being. Only the path of Being can be followed, because non-Being can not be thought or spoken about. To believe in the existence of both Being and non-Being is self-contradictory and makes knowledge impossible. His concept of eternal Being was of one that is without regard to time. As change cannot occur within Being, there are no intervals by which time can be measured. Being is consistent in its form throughout its existence, as the only alternative to its state of being is not being. It is bound by its own form. If Being had come from non-Being, then it would have no reason or cause to come into existence as Being. Being must be eternal, as its origin would either be from non-Being, which cannot exist, or it would be from Being, which means it would have always existed. Being exists infinitely and is indivisible, as any space not occupied by being would be occupied by non-Being, which cannot exist. Being cannot move, as this would require there to be space that it does not already occupy. Parmenides rejected the existence of the Void, as it would necessarily be made of non-Being, which cannot exist.

=== Cosmology ===
Parmenides developed a system defined by opposites, based on light and dark. Mortal perception of the world involves the shifting light and dark within a person, which creates subjective mortal opinions that can differ between individuals. This was the first philosophical model of how sensory perception relates to mental understanding. From the perspective of mortal opinions, each instance of opposites—such as hot and cold or male and female—are derived from the understanding of light and dark as distinct entities. Life and death are a shifting of one's soul from light to dark. In the mortal understanding, the exchange between light and dark is guided by a supreme power and blends the two to create different phenomena. The supreme power, personified by the Goddess, exists in the center of the universe. The existence of light and dark implies that Being and non-Being exist simultaneously. It is this contradiction that prevents mortals from understanding the true nature of Being. These mortal opinions allow the perception of time and change even though they do not exist under a divine understanding.

=== On Nature ===
Since antiquity, it has been believed Parmenides wrote only one work, (Note: Diogenes Laertius, I 16 (A 13).) later titled On Nature, (Note: Diogenes Laertius, VIII 55 (A 9) and Simplicius, De caelo 556, 25 (A 14)) a didactic poem written in dactylic hexameter. Only 160 verses remain today from an original total that was probably near 800. The poem was originally divided into three parts: an introductory proem that contains an allegorical narrative which explains the purpose of the work, a former section known as "The Way of Truth" (aletheia, ἀλήθεια), and a latter section known as "The Way of Appearance/Opinion" (doxa, δόξα). Despite the poem's fragmentary nature, the general plan of both the poem and the first part, "The Way of Truth", have been ascertained by modern scholars, thanks to large excerpts made by Sextus Empiricus (Note: Against the Mathematicians (DK 28B1)) and Simplicius of Cilicia. (Note: Commentary on Aristotle's Physics (DK 28B8)) Unfortunately, the second part, "The Way of Opinion", which is supposed to have been much longer than the first, only survives in small fragments and prose paraphrases.

== Legacy ==
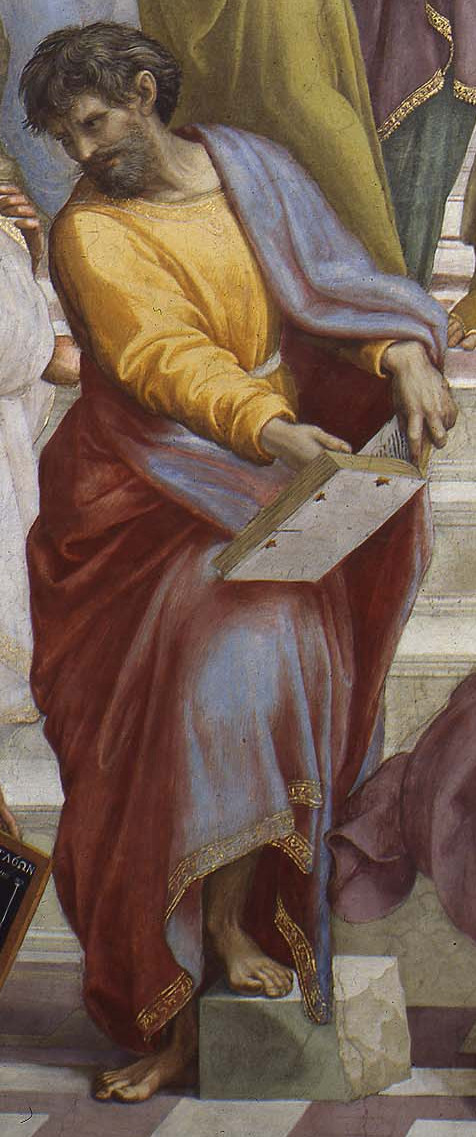
Parmenides. Detail of The School of Athens by Raphael.

As the first of the Eleatics, Parmenides is generally credited with being the philosopher who first defined ontology as a separate discipline distinct from theology. Parmenides was the first Western philosopher to consider the nature of existence itself. While previous philosophers like the Milesians developed theories of how things physically originated, Parmenides considered ontology, or how things are, solely as an idea without reference to a physical basis. He likely rejected the theories of the Milesian school, which described the world as being derived from specific elements, as Parmenides rejected that Being was derived from anything.

Though his ideas preceded and influenced metaphysics, modern philosophers do not consider Parmenides to have studied metaphysics himself, as Being is not a distinct entity from the physical world. Some exceptions exist, such as Pierre Aubenque, who described Parmenides' work as "the birth certificate of Western metaphysics". Parmenides has been seen as the first Western philosopher to invoke what are now considered the basic principles of logic. His concepts of Being and non-Being are defined by the law of noncontradiction; since Being is, it cannot not be, and since non-Being is not, it cannot be. The law of excluded middle prevents the existence of something that neither is nor is not. The principle of sufficient reason indicates that Being must be if it can be thought about, as a thought is something rather than nothing. Parmenides' conclusion is defined by the law of identity, as Being is to be and non-Being is to not be. By combining these logical processes, Parmenides proves a tautology using a syllogism.

Parmenides understood the Moon's illumination to be the reflection of sunlight off of its spherical surface. He is sometimes described as the first philosopher to describe the Earth as spherical and to identify the morning star and the evening star were both manifestations of a single object, Venus.

=== Ancient philosophy ===
==== Pre-Socratic philosophy ====
In modern interpretations, Parmenides is often seen as presenting a theory of unchanging "being" that spurred debate about the nature of change among subsequent natural philosophers in Presocratic philosophy. However, there is no ancient testimony that supports this notion, and most interpreters of Parmenides in Antiquity appear to have read Parmenides as considering metaphysics and physics as two different aspects of the same reality. Parmenides was a contemporary of Heraclitus. The two broached many of the same ideas, such as a world made of two competing opposites, reliability of the senses, and the nature of plurality—it is unclear if either influenced the other.

Parmenides' philosophy formed the basis of the Eleatic school, which was continued by Melissus of Samos and Zeno of Elea. Melissus built on Parmenides' ideas, proposing a continuous eternal Being instead of a constant existence of the present. Zeno created reductio ad absurdum arguments to defend Parmenides' ideas against their critics.

In his work On Non-Being, Gorgias includes both Parmenides and Melissus as philosophers who held that reality is one. The pluralist theories of Empedocles and Anaxagoras and the atomists Leucippus and Democritus have also been seen as a potential response to Parmenides's arguments and conclusions.

=== Plato ===
Along with Socrates and the Pythagoreans, Parmenides was one of the greatest influences on Plato.

In different places, Aristotle attributes the same epistemological position to Parmenides that he does to Plato, that true knowledge must be grounded in an entity that is not subject to change. This position is also endorsed by Plato himself at the end of the 5th book of the Republic. For Plato, these are the forms from his own Theory of Forms. In his own Parmenides, Plato presents a fictional dialogue between Socrates and Parmenides where Parmenides himself also endorses this doctrine, that knowledge must be built on something unchanging.

Plato's understanding of Parmenides is further demonstrated by the second hypothesis in his Parmenides There, the One is shown to have different properties that parallel those laid about by Parmenides himself in Fragment 8: that the One is: in itself, the same as itself, at rest, like itself, and in contact with itself, both "in virtue of its own nature" and "in relation to itself." Plato then has Parmenides show that and that the One is not those same set of attributes, but only "contrary to its own nature" and "not in relation to itself," which parallels Parmenides own division of what is and what appears to be, that the "Way of Truth" corresponds to his own intelligible realm of forms, while the "Way of Opinion" corresponds to the sensible realm of matter. These two aspects of reality are also paralleled in Plato's Timaeus in the descriptions of the universe as a living creature perceived by reason and a cosmos modeled after it that is perceived by the senses. In the Sophist, Plato gives a doxography of the Eleatics beginning not with Parmenides but with Xenophanes, another pre-Socratic philosopher after whom Parmenides followed after, who believed true knowledge was only possible for the gods and that all else was opinion, which provides further support to the idea that Plato saw the monism of Parmenides as not eliminating the possibility of statements about the "Way of Opinion."

==== Aristotle ====
Aristotle, in his Physics, makes reference to unnamed philosophers who reject substantial change because they hold the view that no entity or substance comes into being, which superficially appears to resemble Parmenides own doctrine. However, he cannot be referring to Parmenides here, because in other places he distinguishes between Parmenides' account of "first philosophy" which is not subject to change, and Parmenides' account of natural philosophy, in which he admits the possibility of substantial change. When Aristotle introduces Parmenides own doctrines in the Physics, alongside those of another Eleatic philosopher, Melissus of Samos, he distinguishes between the more strict monism of Melissus, which held that there can only be one substance that exists, and Parmenides' more permissive monism, which considered everything that exists to be substance in virtue of the fact that it exists, but allowed for different substances to exist.

==== Hellenistic and Roman philosophy ====
Some Ancient philosophers did view Parmenides as a strict monist like Melissus, though they represented a minority opinion. Writing in the late 1st century CE, the Middle Platonist philosopher Plutarch, in his treatise Against Colotes attributes this position to Colotes, an Epicurean philosopher from the Hellenistic period. Plutarch, who like many Platonists saw Parmenides as a forerunner of Plato, criticizes Colotes for misrepresenting Parmenides' position, stating that Parmenides distinction between what truly is and what things appear to be according to the senses should not be seen as a rejection of the latter, because, as Plutarch argues, one could not do that without rejecting the existence of the senses themselves.

Eusebius of Caesarea, quoting Aristocles of Messene, says that Parmenides was part of a line of skeptical philosophy that culminated in Pyrrhonism.

For Simplicus, a Neoplatonic philosopher writing in the 6th century, who preserves almost the entirety of our extant fragments of the treatise, the two accounts describes by the goddess in Parmenides poem correspond to two different levels of reality: the intelligible and eternal realm of forms, and the constantly changing sensible world.

=== Modern era ===
The philosophy of Martin Heidegger revisited the concept of a Parmenidean eternal Being. He described Parmenides as the first to create a unified concept of Being and non-Being.

In On Nature, Parmenides describes the truth as the path of that is. The philologist Hermann Fränkel identified this use of an impersonal verb as an atypical grammatical construction in Ancient Greek. It is understood to refer to the concept of Being, described through postposition. The goddess's description of Being is effectively the affirmation of its existence. Aubenque commented that this is "the thesis of Being itself". Ernst Hoffman proposed that Being, discourse, and thought were all the same thing.

Friedrich Nietzsche suggested that Parmenides believed his cosmology, even though he understood that it was only part of the seeming world. Karl Popper said that it was necessary for Parmenides to disprove his own cosmology to prove that the seeming world was not true. He likened this to modern physics, in which theories of physics do not necessarily correspond to what appears to be true.

The question of whether time and space are continuous or discrete is prominent in modern physics, where several mathematicians and physicists propose Parmenidean models. Albert Einstein developed a single model of spacetime to explain the universe. Hermann Weyl argued that time exists only subjectively. Karl Popper further described the ideas of Ludwig Boltzmann, Kurt Gödel, Hermann Minkowski, and Erwin Schrödinger as reminiscent of Parmenides. The Wheeler–DeWitt equation suggests that time does not exist as its own distinct entity.

Among the historians of philosophy and philologists: William Keith Chambers Guthrie observes that the figure of Parmenides is a fundamental milestone that divides the course of Pre-Socratic philosophy in two, because it stopped the inquiry into the origin and constitution of the universe and reoriented the course of archaic thought. Coxon argues that Parmenides was the first genuine philosopher of the Greek world, the founder of European philosophy, and the first proper metaphysician, unlike the other pre-Socratics who discovered the principles of what is now known as science.

== Bibliography ==
=== Ancient testimony ===
In the Diels–Kranz numbering for testimony and fragments of Pre-Socratic philosophy, Parmenides is catalogued as number 28. The most recent edition of this catalogue is:

Diels, Hermann; Kranz, Walther (1957). Plamböck, Gert (ed.). Die Fragmente der Vorsokratiker (in Ancient Greek and German). Rowohlt. OCLC 5859277.

==== Life and doctrines ====
- A1. Laërtius, Diogenes. "Others: Parmenides" . Lives of the Eminent Philosophers. Vol. 2:9. Translated by Hicks, Robert Drew (Two volume ed.). Loeb Classical Library.
- A2. "Parmenides". Suda – via Suda Online.
- A3. Laërtius, Diogenes. "Socrates, with predecessors and followers: Anaximenes" . Lives of the Eminent Philosophers. Vol. 1:2. Translated by Hicks, Robert Drew (Two volume ed.). Loeb Classical Library. § 3.
- A4. Iamblichus. Life of Pythagoras.
- A5. Plato (1925). Parmenides. Plato in Twelve Volumes. Vol. 9. Translated by Harold N. Fowler. 127a.
- A6. Aristotle. Metaphysics. 986b.
- A7. Alexander of Aphrodisias. Commentary on Aristotle's Metaphysics. 984b.
- A8. Simplicius. Commentary On Aristotle's Physics.
- A9. Laërtius, Diogenes. "Others: Protagoras" . Lives of the Eminent Philosophers. Vol. 2:9. Translated by Hicks, Robert Drew (Two volume ed.). Loeb Classical Library.
- A10. Simplicius. Commentary On Aristotle's Physics.
- A11. Eusebius. Chronicon Paschale.
- A12. Strabo. Geographia. Book VI, §1.

==== Fragments ====
- Empiricus, Sextus; Empírico, Sexto (1933). Sextus Empiricus in four volumes: Against the logicians. Vol. 2. Harvard University Press. OCLC 1407491657.
- Simplicius (22 April 2014). Commentary On Aristotle Physics. Vol. 1.3-4. A&C Black. pp. 55–56. ISBN 978-1-4725-1531-5.

=== Modern scholarship ===
- Curd, Patricia (2004). The Legacy of Parmenides: Eleatic Monism and Later Presocratic Thought. Parmenides Pub. ISBN 978-1-930972-15-5.
- Freeman, Kathleen (1946). The Pre-Socratic Philosophers. Great Britain in the City Of Oxford at the Alden Press: Oxford Basil Blackwell. p. 140.
- Furley, D.J. (1973). Exegesis and Argument: Studies in Greek Philosophy presented to Gregory Vlastos.
- Grondin, Jean (2012) [2004]. Introduction to Metaphysics: From Parmenides to Levinas. Translated by Soderstrom, Lukas. Columbia University Press. ISBN 978-0-231-14844-3.
- Guthrie, W. K. C. (1979). A History of Greek Philosophy – The Presocratic tradition from Parmenides to Democritus. Cambridge University Press.
- Kirk, G. S.; Raven, J. E.; Schofield, M. (1983). The presocratic philosophers : a critical history with a selection of texts (2nd ed.). Cambridge: Cambridge University Press. p. 243. ISBN 978-0-521-27455-5.
- Nussbaum, Martha (1979). "Eleatic Conventionalism and Philoaus on the Conditions of Thought". Harvard Studies in Classical Philology. 83: 63–108. doi:10.2307/311096. JSTOR 311096.
- Palmer, John (2020). "Parmenides". In Zalta, Edward N. (ed.). Stanford Encyclopedia of Philosophy. ISSN 1095-5054. OCLC 429049174.
- Sedley, David (1998). "Parmenides". In Craig, Edward (ed.). Routledge encyclopedia of philosophy. London: Routledge. ISBN 9780415169165.
- Vamvacas, Constantine J. (2009). The Founders of Western Thought – The Presocratics: A Diachronic Parallelism Between Presocratic Thought and Philosophy and the Natural Sciences. Springer Science & Business Media. doi:10.1007/978-1-4020-9791-1. ISBN 978-1-4020-9791-1.
