= Theaetetus (mathematician) =

Greek mathematician (c.417–c. 369 BCE)

Theaetetus of Athens (/ˌθiːɪˈtiːtəs/; Ancient Greek: Θεαίτητος, romanized: Theaítētos; c. 417 – c. 369 BCE), possibly the son of Euphronius of the Athenian deme Sunium, was a Greek mathematician. His principal contributions were on irrational lengths, which was included in Book X of Euclid's Elements and proving that there are precisely five regular convex polyhedra. A friend of Socrates and Plato, he is the central character in Plato's eponymous Socratic dialogue.

Theaetetus, like Plato, was a student of the Greek mathematician Theodorus of Cyrene. Cyrene was a prosperous Greek colony on the coast of North Africa, in what is now Libya, on the eastern end of the Gulf of Sidra. Theodorus had explored the theory of incommensurable quantities, and Theaetetus continued those studies with great enthusiasm; specifically, he classified various forms of irrational numbers according to the way they are expressed as square roots. This theory is presented in great detail in Book X of Euclid's Elements.

Theaetetus was one of the few Greek mathematicians who was actually a native of Athens. Most Greek mathematicians of antiquity came from the numerous Greek cities scattered around the Ionian coast, the Black Sea and the whole Mediterranean basin.

He evidently resembled Socrates in the snubness of his nose and bulging of his eyes. This and most of what is known of him comes from Plato, who named a dialogue after him, the Theaetetus. He apparently died from wounds and dysentery on his way home after fighting in an Athenian battle at Corinth, now presumed to have occurred in 369 BC; some scholars argue alternately for 391 BC as his date of death, the date of an earlier battle at Corinth.

The crater Theaetetus on the Moon is named after him.

== See also ==
- List of speakers in Plato's dialogues

== Sources ==
- François Lasserre (1987). De Léodamas de Thasos à Philippe d'Oponte : témoignages et fragments. pp. 47–66.
- Thomas L. Heath (1949). Mathematics in Aristotle. pp. 2, 208, 256. ISBN 9-781138-942417.
- Thomas L. Heath (1921). A History of Greek Mathematics. Vol. 1. pp. 2, 22–3, 119, 155, 159, 162, 170, 203–5, 209–12, 216–7, 304. ISBN 0-486-24073-8.
