= The Mask of Apollo =

Novel by Mary Renault

- First edition, 1966
- Author: Mary Renault
- Cover artist: Claire Williams
- Language: English
- Subject: Classical Mythology
- Genre: Historical fiction
- Publisher: Longmans, Green & Co, London; Pantheon, New York
- Publication date: 1966
- Publication place: United Kingdom
- English publication date: England 1966
- Media type: Print
- Pages: 366
- ISBN: 978-0-09-946941-4 (Arrow paperback UK 2004 edition)
- OCLC: 59272575

The Mask of Apollo is a historical novel written by Mary Renault. Set in the ancient Greek world during the 4th century BC, the novel is written as the first-person narrative of a fictional character, Nikeratos (or 'Niko'), an actor. Throughout his professional life and his work in Syracuse and Athens, Nikeratos meets several historical characters and becomes a witness (and sometimes a marginal participant) in the political conflicts of Syracuse.

== Plot ==
Involved from early childhood in the theatre, the Athenian-born Nikeratos grows into a successful actor through his performances in tragedies. During his formative period, he meets the philosopher Plato and Dion, a respected politician from Syracuse and brother-in-law to the city's tyrannical ruler Dionysios the Elder. As Archon Dionysios rules harshly from the island fortress of Ortygia, through a powerful force of mercenaries of diverse origins. He does however provide effective protection for the citizens of Syracuse from the threat of Carthage.

Nikeratos frequents Plato's Academy and grows to appreciate his wisdom, though he also discerns that Plato and Dion are somewhat more idealistic than practical in their views on humanity and government.

Nikeratos sails for Syracuse as a member of a theatre troupe, but upon arrival receives the news that Dionysios, their patron, has just died. Nikeratos chooses to remain in Syracuse despite the dangerous political climate, and meets and makes a favourable impression upon the city's new ruler, Dionysios the Younger. While Dionysios is not the brutal tyrant his father was, he is dissolute and politically inept, and Dion invites Plato to serve as a teacher to Dionysios; the two hope to mould him into a philosopher-king ruling according to Platonic ideals.

While Dionysios wants Plato's approval, he makes only half-hearted efforts to reform either his own luxurious lifestyle or the Syracusan government. Part of this is due to his own nature, but other factors also inhibit reform, such as Syracuse's large and oppressive mercenary force, who are necessary to counter Carthaginian aggression, and the Syracusan people themselves, who have become politically enfeebled under Dionysios the Elder's long rule. Dion is eventually exiled due to the machinations of his rival Philistos, a loyal but corrupt supporter of Dionysios.

During these years Nikeratos has a successful career acting in Syracuse and mainland Greece. He becomes a lifelong friend and mentor to a promising young actor named Thettalos while keeping informed about events in Syracuse and Plato's life there.

After Dionysios confiscates Dion's estates and gives his wife to another man, Dion returns with an army and captures most of Syracuse while Dionysios' loyalists hold out in the island citadel of Ortygia. In the ensuing fighting Syracuse is brutally ravaged before Dion gains the upper hand. Philistos is killed by the vengeful citizenry and Dionysios flees to live out his remaining years in exile. Dion is initially welcomed as a liberator by the Syracusans, but his attempts at reform prove unpopular and he is eventually assassinated. He is succeeded by Callippus, an ambitious and unscrupulous pupil of Plato.

In the novel's final chapter, a dozen years after Dion's downfall, Nikeratos encounters the young Alexander the Great and wistfully regrets that Plato never had the chance to tutor Alexander, who might have pursued Plato's social ideals with far greater success than Dionysios the Younger did.
