= Leptines II =

4th-century BC Greek general

Leptines II (Ancient Greek: Λεπτίνης Β΄; died after 342 BC), son of Leptines I, was the nephew of Dionysius the Elder.

In 351 BC, Leptines aided Callippus in successfully expelling the garrison of Dionysius the Younger from Rhegium. After civil unrest within the city, Leptines and Polyperchon turned on Callippus stabbing him with reputedly the same sword that killed Dion. (352 BC)

In 342 BC, when Timoleon liberated Sicily, Leptines was sent into exile. He died in Corinth.
