= Seventh Letter =

Epistle ascribed to Plato

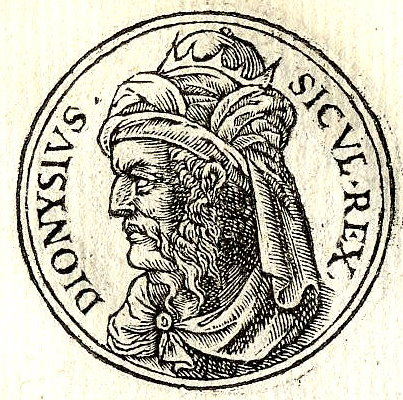
Dionysius I of Syracuse

The Seventh Letter of Plato is an epistle that tradition has ascribed to Plato. It is by far the longest of the epistles of Plato and gives an autobiographical account of his activities in Sicily as part of the intrigues between Dion and Dionysius of Syracuse for the tyranny of Syracuse. It also contains an extended philosophical interlude concerning the possibility of writing true philosophical works and the theory of forms. Assuming that the letter is authentic, it was written after Dion was assassinated by Calippus in 353 BC and before the latter was in turn overthrown a year later.

== Authenticity ==
Of all the letters attributed to Plato, the Seventh Letter is widely considered the only one that might be authentic. R. Ledger defends its authenticity on the basis of computer analysis. Anthony Kenny is likewise inclined to accept it as genuine. The main objections to its authenticity involve its statement that there are forms or ideas of artificial things, whereas Aristotle attributes to Plato the idea that there are forms or ideas only of natural things, as well as the fact that the letter's purported historical setting seems unlikely: the letter implies that Dion's followers wrote to Plato asking him for practical political advice while at the same time insinuating that he had not been loyal to Dion, that Calippus permitted the letter to get to Plato, and that Plato replied by recounting in detail recent history to people who were immediately involved in those events and included in his advice a long digression on the theory of forms. These problems lead R. G. Bury to conclude that the letter was an open letter intended to defend Plato in the eyes of his fellow Athenians rather than to be sent to Dion's followers in Sicily; there probably never was any letter from them to Plato, he says.

In recent times the Seventh Letter has been argued to be spurious by prominent scholars such as Malcolm Schofield, Myles Burnyeat, George Boas, Terence Irwin, and Julia Annas. According to Annas, the Seventh Letter is "such an unconvincing production that its acceptance by many scholars is best seen as indicating the strength of their desire to find, behind the detachment of the dialogues, something, no matter what, to which Plato is straightforwardly committed."

== Structure and summary ==
The Seventh Letter touches upon a variety of themes, not always in an organized fashion. This article follows Bury in dividing its summary into the following sections.

=== Introduction (323d–326b) ===
Plato opens by assuring Dion's followers that he shares Dion's political goals. He then says how he came to hold his opinions concerning politics by recounting his early life and political disillusionment following the Thirty Tyrants and the trial of Socrates.

=== First visit to Sicily (326b–328d) ===
Plato tells of his first visit to Syracuse, where he befriended Dion during the reign of Dionysius the Elder. Dionysius the Elder died after Plato had returned home and Dion urged him to educate the younger Dionysius, who had ascended to the tyranny, with the aim of transforming him into a philosopher king.

=== Second visit to Sicily (328d–330b) ===
Plato explains that he agreed to Dion's proposal lest he seem to be a bad friend and to care nothing for philosophy's reputation, but the visit turned out to be a failure. Dion fell from Dionysius' good graces due to courtiers' slanders; Plato himself fell under suspicion of seeking to overthrow Dionysius. He continued to attempt to give the tyrant good counsel, however.

=== The limits of counsel (330c–331d) ===
Plato leaves off the historical narrative, but before giving his advice to Dion's friends and followers he notes that one should not attempt to advise those who will not heed good advice. One should not tell those who do not wish to be virtuous how best to satisfy their vicious desires, nor should one compel those who are not willing to listen.

=== The effects of attempting to advise Dionysius (331d–334c) ===
Plato advises Dion's followers in the same way that he and Dion had advised Dionysius the Younger. They had attempted to remind him of his father's unhappiness, counseling him to lead a moderate personal life and make friends with good men. This advice would have required him to renounce the company of those courtiers who benefited from his immoderation, so these conspired to slander Dion such that he was exiled again. Dion returned to admonish Dionysius "by deed" (333b; i.e., at the head of an army), but the Syracuseans themselves believed slanders that Dion was attempting to set himself up as a tyrant and supported Dion's murder. Because those who assassinated Dion were Athenians, Plato defends Athens, saying that Dion's best friend (himself) was also Athenian.

=== Plato's present advice (334c–337e) ===
Plato admonishes the addressees with the same advice that he and Dion had given Dionysius the Younger, viz. to abolish the despotism in Sicily and establish a constitutional government in each city with just laws. He claims that Dionysius lives an ignoble life because he did not heed this advice, while Dion died a noble death because he followed it. Dion would have ruled by law. Plato counsels his followers to avoid partisan strife, live moderately, and seek no reprisals in their hour of victory. Since the ideal political order of rule by a philosopher king is now impossible, he says, let the second-best of rule by law come about.

=== Between Plato's second and third visits to Sicily (337e–340b) ===
Plato resumes his historical narrative where he had left off. War compelled Plato to leave Sicily during his second visit there. Before permitting him to leave, however, Dionysius had extracted a promise that he would return when hostilities ceased and Plato had agreed on the condition that Dion be recalled from exile. Dion was not recalled and Plato was reluctant to return, but was persuaded by Dion and by Archytas of Tarentum of the prudence of doing so, especially as Dionysius himself was rumored to be interested in philosophy again.

=== Third visit to Sicily (340b–341a) ===
Upon his arrival, Plato decided to test whether Dionysius' attachment to philosophy was genuine by informing him of the various unexciting preparatory studies he would need to undertake.

=== Long digression on the Forms (341b–345c) ===
Dionysius claimed to already be an expert on philosophy and therefore turned out to be a bad pupil, Plato claims. Plato claims that Dionysius was an impostor, for he had written a metaphysical treatise that he claimed was superior to Plato's lectures. Plato can claim that Dionysius was an impostor because the truth about metaphysics cannot be expressed in writing and all those who know the truth know this; hence, if Dionysius thought he had expressed the truth about metaphysics in writing, he did not know the truth.

Plato's explanation of why the deepest truths cannot be expressed in written form is famously abstruse. Before one attains the "thing which is cognizable and true" (gnōston te kai alēthes), one must have apprehended the "name," "account" (logos), "image," and "knowledge" (epistēmē). Name and account are approached through verbal description, while sense perception perceives the image. One attains knowledge only from the combination of verbal description and sense perception, and one must have knowledge before one can attain the object of knowledge (which Plato calls simply "the Fifth," name, account, image, and knowledge being "the Four"). The Fifth, moreover, differs from what is sensible and verbal expressions of it. Name and account provide the "quality" of a thing (to poion), but not its "essence" or "being" (to on). They are, moreover, akin to sense perceptions in that they are ever shifting and relative, not fixed. As a result, the student who attempts to understand the Fifth through name, account, image, and knowledge is confused; he seeks the essence, but always finds the quality intruding. Only certain kinds of student can scrutinize the Four, and even then the vision of the Fifth comes by a sudden flash.

Since this is how philosophy is conducted, no serious person would ever attempt to teach serious philosophic doctrines in a book or to the public at large. Dionysius' motivation for having written a philosophic text must have been a desire for glory. Indeed, he had received only one lecture on metaphysics from Plato.

=== Resumption of the narrative of the third visit (345c–350b) ===
Dionysius abused Plato in several ways during his third visit to Syracuse. He had promised to send Dion the revenues of his property in Sicily, but reneged. Plato in response threatened to leave and was assuaged only when Dionysius proposed a compromise; Plato agreed to remain only until Dion had replied. Before that could happen, however, Dionysius sold Dion's property on the cheap, appointed himself the warden of half of the proceeds on behalf of Dion's son, and would let Plato take only the other half to Dion in exile. Moreover, the sailing season had already ended and so Plato was forced to remain in Syracuse anyway.

In the meantime, Dionysius' attempts to cut the pay of the mercenaries who supported his rule provoked a mutiny that was blamed on Heracleides, the leader of the democratic party in Syracuse. Theodotes persuaded Dionysius in Plato's presence to permit Heracleides to leave the city in peace, but Dionysius used this merely to flush him out of hiding. When Dionysius claimed never to have made any promise to let him go, Plato spoke up and affirmed that he had.

As a result, Dionysius found a pretext for expelling Plato from the palace (where he had been housed) and lodging him in the soldiers' quarters. He then claimed that Theodotes' visits to him there were a sign that he was conspiring with his enemies. Plato pleaded with Archytas, who persuaded Tarentum to send a vessel for him.

=== Dion's invasion and assassination (350b–351e) ===
After leaving Sicily for the third and final time, Plato traveled to Olympia, where he met Dion preparing for war. Dion asked Plato for his support, but he refused, claiming that he had been a guest in Dionysius' house and that he did not relish the problems that would be caused by a civil war. Dion invaded anyway and was unsuccessful. Plato eulogizes Dion, claiming that he sought power only for the common good. Dion fell, he says, because he underestimated the viciousness of the men he was opposing.

=== Conclusion (351e–352a) ===
Plato explains why he went into such detail about his third visit, despite having already given his advice as to how Dion's followers should proceed. He desired, he says, to defend himself against slanders that had circulated about his motives and actions.

== Editions ==
- Henri Estienne (ed.), Platonis opera quae extant omnia, Vol. 3, 1578, p. 323.

== See also ==
- Dion of Syracuse
- Dionysius II of Syracuse
- Epistles (Plato)
- Divided line
- Substantial form
- Plato's unwritten doctrines, for debates over Plato's esotericism and the Seventh Letter
