= Arete (daughter of Dionysius) =

4th-century BC Greek woman

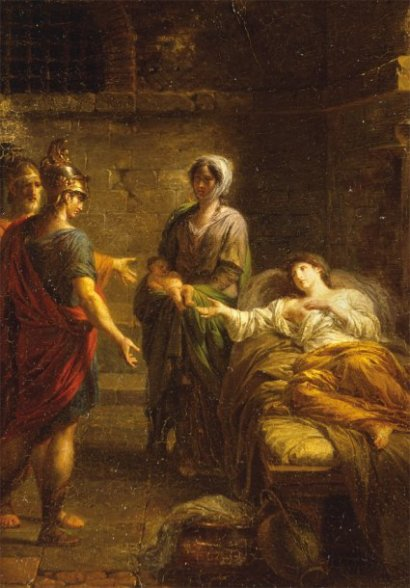

Arete (Ancient Greek: Ἀρετή) was the daughter of the Syracusan tyrant Dionysius I of Syracuse (Magna Graecia) with Aristomache.

Arete was first married to Thearides, and upon his death to her uncle, Dion of Syracuse, the brother of her mother Aristomache. After Dion had fled from Syracuse during the reign of the younger Dionysius, Arete was compelled by her brother to marry Timocrates of Syracuse, one of his friends; but she was again received by Dion as his wife, when he had obtained possession of Syracuse and expelled the younger Dionysius, Dionysius II of Syracuse.

After Dion's assassination in 353 BCE, Arete was imprisoned together with her mother and brought forth a son while in confinement. Arete and Aristomache were subsequently liberated and kindly received by Hicetas of Leontini, one of Dion's friends, but he was afterward persuaded by the enemies of Dion to drown them.
