= Hipparinus =

Hipparinus may refer to:

- Hipparinus, the father of Dion (tyrant of Syracuse) and father-in-law and advisor of Dionysius the Elder
- Hipparinus, tyrant of Syracuse from 352 to 351 BCE and a son of Dionysius the Elder
- Hipparinus, the son of Dion (tyrant of Syracuse)
- Hipparinus of Heraclea, beloved of the tyrant-slayer Antileon of Metapontum
