= Timocrates =

Timocrates may refer to:

- "Against Timocrates", a speech by Demosthenes
- Timocrates of Syracuse, husband to Arete (daughter of Dionysius)
- Timocrates of Rhodes, (4th century BC) a Rhodian Greek opposed to Sparta
- Timocrates of Lampsacus, (3rd century BC) disciple of Epicurus, but who later became his enemy
