= Lamiskos =

Lamiskos (4th century BC) was an ancient Greek Pythagorean philosopher. Born in Tarentum in Magna Graecia, Lamiskos was a follower of the Pythagorean philosopher Archytas. Around 360 BC, when Plato was imprisoned by Dionysius the Younger, Archytas sent Lamiskos to secure his release, and Lamiskos successfully persuaded Dionysius to release the Athenian philosopher, allowing him to return to his homeland.
