= Heracleides (admiral) =

Politic

Heracleides (Ancient Greek: Ἡρακλείδης) was a Syracusan of Magna Graecia who held the chief command of the mercenary forces under Dionysius II of Syracuse.

We have little information as to the causes which led to his exile from Syracuse, but it may be inferred, from an expression of Plutarch that he was suspected of conspiring with Dion of Syracuse and others to overthrow Dionysius: and it seems clear that he must have fled from Syracuse either at the same time with Dion and Dion's son Megacles, or shortly afterwards.

Having joined the other exiles in the Peloponnesus, he co-operated with Dion in his preparations for the overthrow of Dionysius, and the liberation of Syracuse, but did not accompany him when he actually sailed, having remained behind in the Peloponnesus in order to assemble a larger force both of ships and soldiers. According to the historian Diodorus Siculus, his departure was for some time retarded by adverse weather; but Plutarch (whose account is throughout unfavorable to Heracleides) ascribes the delay to his jealousy of Dion. It is certain, however, that he eventually joined the latter at Syracuse, with a force of 20 triremes and 1,500 heavy-armed troops. He was received with acclamations by the Syracusans, who immediately proclaimed him commander-in-chief of their naval forces, an appointment which was resented by Dion as an infringement of the supreme authority already entrusted to himself; but the people having revoked their decree, he himself reinstated Heracleides of his own authority.

Dionysius was at this time shut up in the island citadel of Ortygia, and mainly dependent for his supplies upon the command of the sea. Philistus now approached to his relief with a fleet of 60 triremes, but he was encountered by Heracleides with a force about equal to his own; and after an obstinate combat, totally defeated. Philistus himself fell into the hands of the Syracusans, by whom he was put to death; and Dionysius, now almost despairing of success, soon after quit Syracuse, leaving Apollocrates in charge of the citadel in 356 BC. The distinguished part which Heracleides had borne in these successes led him to contest with Dion the position of leader in those that remained to be achieved, and his pretensions were supported by a large party among the Syracusans themselves, who are said to have entertained less jealousy of his seeking to possess himself of the sovereign power than they felt in regard to Dion.

Unfortunately our knowledge of the subsequent intrigues and dissensions between the two leaders is almost wholly derived from Plutarch; and his manifest partiality to Dion renders his statements concerning his rival liable to much suspicion. Heracleides was at first triumphant; twenty-five generals, of whom he was one, were appointed to take the command, and Dion retired in disgust, accompanied by the mercenary troops in his pay, to Leontini. But the mismanagement of the new generals, and the advantages gained by Hypsius, who had arrived in the citadel with a large reinforcement, soon compelled the Syracusans to have recourse once more to Dion.

Heracleides had been disabled by a wound; but he not only joined in sending messages to Dion, imploring his assistance, but immediately on his arrival placed himself in his power, and sued for forgiveness. This was readily granted by Dion, who was reinstated in his position of general autocrator, on the proposal of Heracleides himself, and in return bestowed upon the latter once more the sole command by sea. Yet the reconciliation was far from sincere: Heracleides, if we may believe the accounts of his enemies, withdrew, with the fleet under his command, to Messana, and even entered into negotiations with Dionysius: but he was again induced to submit to Dion, who (contrary, it is said, to the advice of all his friends) spared his life, and restored him to favor. But when the departure of Apollocrates had left Dion sole master of Syracuse in 354 BC, he no longer hesitated to remove his rival, whom he justly regarded as the chief obstacle to his ambitious designs; and under pretense that Heracleides was again intriguing against him, he had him put to death in his own house by a band of armed men.

The popularity of Heracleides was so great, and the grief and indignation of the Syracusans, on learning his death, broke forth with so much violence, that Dion was compelled to honor him with a splendid funeral, and to make a public oration in extenuation of his crime.
