= Euphraeus =

4th-century BC Greek philosopher and politician

Euphraeus (Ancient Greek: Εὐφραῖος; fl. c. 4th century BC; d. ca. 342 BC/341 BC) was a philosopher and student of Plato from the town of Oreus in northern Euboea. He appears to have been active in politics in addition to his speculative studies, being first an adviser to Perdiccas III of Macedon and then an opponent of Philip II and his supporters in Oreus. Information regarding his life is scant, however, and few facts about it are mentioned in more than one source. He appears in the Fifth Letter of Plato, Demosthenes' Third Philippic, and Athenaeus' Deipnosophistae (which repeats the information about him contained in the now-lost Historical Notes by Carystius of Pergamum).

== Life ==
None of the sources that mention him say anything about his family or early life. Most of what is known about him involves his political activity.

Little is said about Euphraeus in the Fifth Letter of Plato beyond his aptitude for political philosophy, and the letter's authenticity has been challenged. The letter commends Euphraeus to Perdiccas III, king of Macedon. This story, at least, is supported by Carystius, who cites a letter supposedly by Speusippus (Plato's nephew and successor as head of the Academy) that Philip II should cease slandering Plato because he owes him his kingship, if rather backhandedly. Plato, the story goes, sent Euphraeus to Perdiccas, Euphraeus counselled that he grant a principality to his brother Philip, and Philip's military occupation of this land enabled him to seize power following Perdiccas' death.

Carystius provides a rather comical portrait of Euphraeus's tenure with Perdiccas. "Euphraeus for example, when staying at the court of King Perdiccas in Macedonia, lorded it as regally as the king himself, though he was of low origin and given to slander; he was so pedantic in his selection of the king’s associates that nobody could share in the common mess if he did not know how to practise geometry or philosophy." Carystius attributes Euphraeus' death following the ascension of Philip to the hatred that this behavior aroused.

Demosthenes is far more sympathetic toward Euphraeus, on the other hand. While not mentioning any viziership to Perdiccas, or any reason why the democratic party in Oreus agreed with "malicious pleasure" that he deserved his unfortunate end, Demosthenes does support the idea that Euphraeus was an active participant in politics. He does not note any explicit connection with Plato, but does say that Euphraeus had once resided in Athens. Demosthenes praises Euphraeus for leading the fight in Oreus against Philip's imperial designs. According to Demosthenes, Euphraeus charged those in his city who supported Philip with treason a year before Parmenion invaded, but was himself thrown into prison as a disturber of the peace as a result. When Oreus was taken by Philip's forces, Euphraeus committed suicide. Demosthenes praises him effusively, comparing Euphraeus' position to his own and employing the entire story as a cautionary tale regarding the risks run by both Athens and Demosthenes himself in struggling for the good of Athens.

== See also ==
- Demosthenes
- Fifth Letter (Plato)
- Perdiccas III of Macedon
- Philip II of Macedon
