= Protagoras (disambiguation) =

Protagoras was a pre-Socratic Greek philosopher.

Protagoras may also refer to:

- Protagoras (crater), a lunar impact crater
- Protagoras (dialogue), a dialogue of Plato
- Protagoras (geographer), a geographer of uncertain date, who lived later than Claudius Ptolemy and summarized his work.
