= Calippus =

Callippus /kəˈlɪp.əs/ may refer to:

- Callippus of Syracuse (died 352/51 BC), an Athenian student of Plato and tyrant of Syracuse
- Callippus (Calippus of Cyzicus, c. 370–300 BC), a Greek astronomer and mathematician
- Callippus of Athens (fl. 279 BC), an Athenian commander in the Battle of Thermopylae (279 BC)
- Calippus (crater), a small lunar crater
- Calippus (mammal), an extinct relative of the modern horse
