= Aristomache =

4th-century BC Greek woman

Aristomache (Ancient Greek: Ἀριστομάχη) was the daughter of Hipparinus of Syracuse (Magna Graecia), and the sister of the Sicilian tyrant Dion of Syracuse.

Aristomache was married to the tyrant Dionysius I of Syracuse on the same day that he married Doris of Locris. Aristomache and Dionysius had two sons and two daughters, with one of whom, namely Arete, she afterwards perished.

After Dion's assassination in 353 BCE, Aristomache was imprisoned together with her daughter. Both were subsequently liberated and kindly received by Hicetas of Leontini, one of Dion's friends, but he was afterwards persuaded by the enemies of Dion to drown both mother and daughter.
