= Athanas of Syracuse =

Ancient Greek writer on Sicily

Athanas (Ancient Greek: Ἀθάνας, fl. 4th century BCE) of Syracuse was a historical writer who wrote a work on Sicily and Dion of Syracuse that continued the history of Philistus, and was quoted respectfully by the historians Plutarch and Diodorus Siculus.

He is probably the same as the writer named "Athanis" mentioned by the grammarian Athenaeus who also wrote a work on Sicily.
