= Hipparinus (father of Dion) =

Advisor to Dionysius I and father of Dion (tyrants of Syracuse)

Hipparinus was a Syracusan from Magna Graecia, father of the tyrant Dion of Syracuse.

He is mentioned by Aristotle as a man of large fortune, and one of the chief citizens of Syracuse, who, having squandered his own property in luxury and extravagance, lent his support to Dionysius I of Syracuse in obtaining the sovereignty of his native city.

According to Plutarch, he was associated with Dionysius in the command as general autocrator, a statement which was understood by the historian William Mitford as referring to the time when Dionysius obtained the virtual sovereignty under that title, in the spring of 405 BCE. It is more probable that it relates to the appointment of the ten generals in the preceding year, and that Hipparinus, as well as Dionysius, was one of these.

We hear no more of him from this time, but from the tyrant having married his daughter Aristomache, as well as from the position assumed by his son Dion, it is clear that he must have continued to hold a high place in the favor of Dionysius as long as he lived.
