= Speusippus =

4th-century BC Greek philosopher

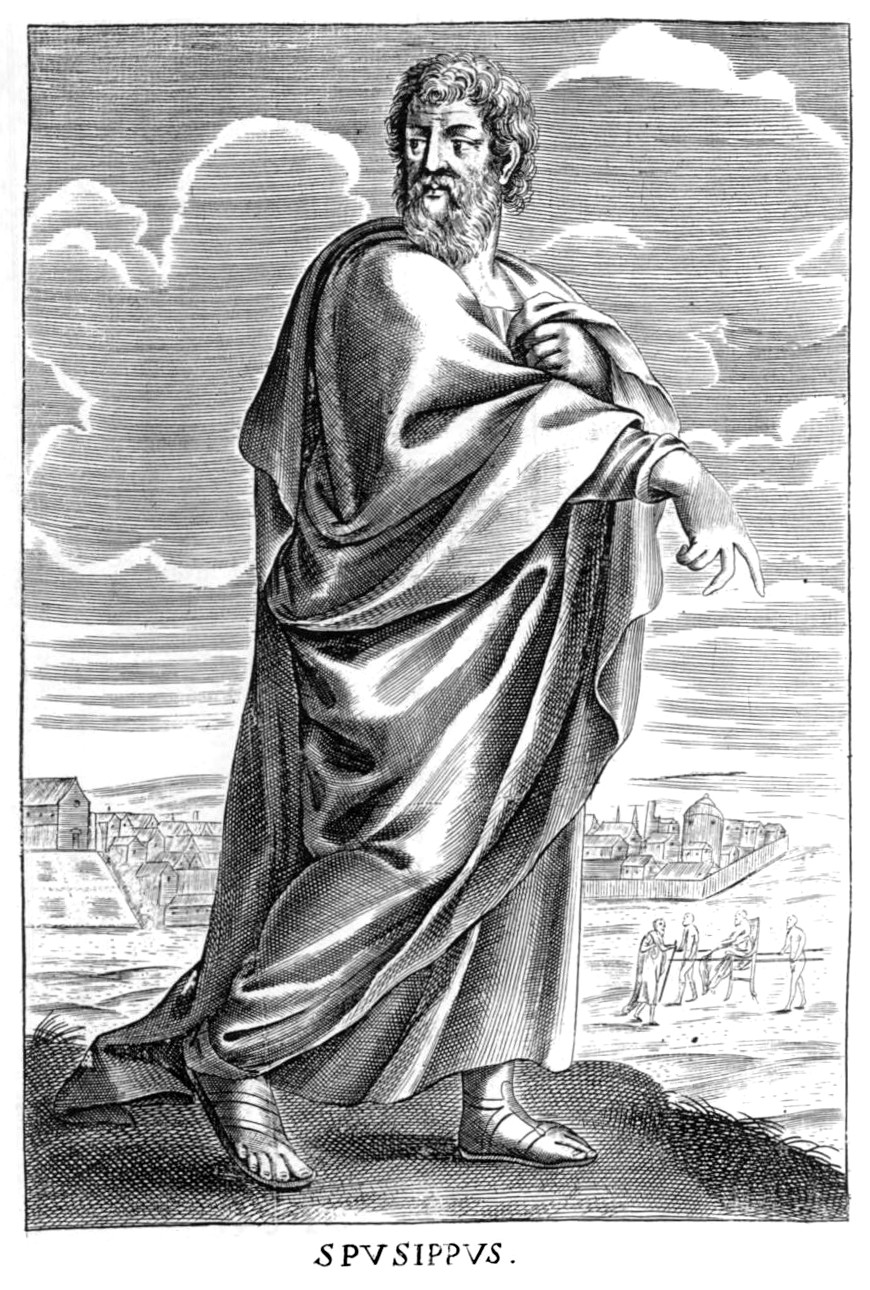
- Speusippus, 17th-century engraving
- Born: c. 408 BC; Athens
- Died: 339/8 BC; Athens

Philosophical work
- Era: Ancient philosophy
- Region: Western philosophy
- School: Platonism
- Main interests: Epistemology, Metaphysics, Ethics
- Notable ideas: Developed the philosophy of Plato, but rejected the Theory of Forms

Speusippus (/spjuːˈsɪpəs/; Ancient Greek: Σπεύσιππος; c. 408 – 339/8 BC) was an ancient Greek philosopher. Speusippus was Plato's nephew by his sister Potone. After Plato's death, c. 348 BC, Speusippus inherited the Academy, near age 60, and remained its head for the next eight years. However, following a stroke, he passed the chair to Xenocrates. Although the successor to Plato in the Academy, Speusippus frequently diverged from Plato's teachings. He rejected Plato's Theory of Forms, and whereas Plato had identified the Good with the ultimate principle, Speusippus maintained that the Good was merely secondary. He also argued that it is impossible to have satisfactory knowledge of any thing without knowing all the differences by which it is separated from everything else.

The standard edition of the surviving fragments and testimonies is Leonardo Tarán's Speusippus of Athens: A Critical Study with a Collection of the Related Texts and Commentary (1982).

== Life ==
Speusippus was a native of Athens, and the son of Eurymedon and Potone, a sister of Plato, he belonged to the deme of Myrrhinus. The pseudonymous Thirteenth Letter of Plato claims that Speusippus married his niece (his mother's granddaughter). We hear nothing of his life until the time when he accompanied his uncle Plato on his third journey to Syracuse (Italy), where he displayed considerable ability and prudence, especially in his amicable relations with Dion. His moral worth is recognised even by Timon, though only that he may heap the more unsparing ridicule on his intellect.

The report about his sudden fits of anger, his greed, and his debauchery, are probably derived from a very impure source: Athenaeus and Diogenes Laërtius can adduce as authority for them scarcely anything more than the abuse in some spurious letters of Dionysius the Younger, who was banished by Dion, with the cooperation of Speusippus. Having been selected by Plato as his successor as the leader (scholarch) of the Academy, he was at the head of the school for only eight years (348/7–339/8 BC). He died, it appears, of a lingering paralytic illness, presumably a stroke. He was succeeded as the head of the school by Xenocrates.

== Philosophy ==
Diogenes Laërtius gives us a list of some of the titles of the many dialogues and commentaries of Speusippus, which is of little help in determining their contents, and the fragments provided by other writers provide us with only a little extra.

=== Epistemology ===
Speusippus was interested in bringing together those things which were similar in their philosophical treatment, and in the derivation, and laying down, of the ideas of genera and species: for he was interested in what the various sciences had in common, and how they might be connected. Thus he furthered the threefold division of philosophy into Dialectics, Ethics, and Physics, for which Plato had laid the foundation, without losing sight of the mutual connection of these three branches of philosophy. Speusippus maintained that no one could arrive at a complete definition who did not know all the differences by which a thing which was to be defined was separated from the rest.

Like Plato, Speusippus distinguished between that which is the object of thought, and that which is the object of sensuous perception, between the cognition of the reason and sensuous perception. He tried, however, to show how perception can be taken up and transformed into knowledge, by the assumption of a perception, which, by participation in rational truth, raises itself to the rank of knowledge. By this he seems to have understood an immediate (in the first instance aesthetic) mode of conception; since he appealed, in support of this view, to the consideration that artistic skill has its foundation, not in sensuous activity, but in an unerring power of distinguishing between its objects, that is, in a rational perception of them.

=== Metaphysics ===
Speusippus rejected Plato's Theory of Forms; whereas Plato distinguished between ideal numbers (i.e. the Platonic Forms of numbers) and mathematical numbers, Speusippus rejected the ideal numbers, and consequently the ideas. He tried to determine the idea of substance more distinctly by separating its types, the difference between which he considered would result from the difference between the principles (archai) on which they are based. Thus he distinguished substances of number, of size, of soul, while Plato had referred them, as separate entities, to the ideal numbers.

Speusippus made still more kinds of substance, beginning with the One, and assuming principles for each kind of substance, one for numbers, another for spatial magnitudes, and then another for the soul; and by going on in this way he multiplies the kinds of substance.

Nevertheless, Speusippus also must have recognised something common in those different kinds of substances, inasmuch as, firstly, he set out from the absolute One, and regarded it as a formal principle which they had in common, and, secondly, he appears to have assumed that multitude and multiformity was a common primary element in their composition. But it is only the difficulties which led him to make this and similar deviations from the Platonist doctrine, of which we can get any clear idea, not the way in which he thought he had avoided those difficulties by distinguishing different kinds of principles. The criticism of Aristotle, directed apparently against Speusippus, shows how little satisfied he was with the modification of the original Platonist doctrine.

With this deviation from Plato's doctrine is connected another which takes a wider range. As the ultimate principle, Speusippus would not, with Plato, recognise the Good, but, with others (who doubtless were also Platonists), going back to the older Theologi, maintained that the principles of the universe were to be set down as causes of the good and perfect, but were not the good and perfect itself, which must rather be regarded as the result of generated existence, or development, just as the seeds of plants and animals are not the fully formed plants or animals themselves.

Speusippus [supposes] that supreme beauty and goodness are not present in the beginning, because the beginnings both of plants and of animals are causes, but beauty and completeness are in the effects of these.

The ultimate principle he designated, like Plato, as the absolute One, but it was not to be regarded as an existing entity, since all entities can only be the result of development. When, however, with the Pythagoreans, he reckoned the One in the series of good things, he probably conceived it only in its opposition to the Many, and wished to indicate that it was from the One and not from the Many, that the good and perfect is to be derived. Nevertheless, Speusippus seems to have attributed vital activity to the primordial Unity, as inseparably belonging to it, probably in order to explain how it could grow, by a process of self-development, into the good, spirit, etc.; for spirit also he distinguished from the one, as well as from the good; and the good from pleasure and pain. Less worthy of notice is the attempt by Speusippus to find a more suitable expression for the material principle, the indefinite duality of Plato; and his Pythagorizing mode of treating the doctrine of numbers which we can see in the extracts of his treatise on the Pythagorean numbers.

=== Ethics ===
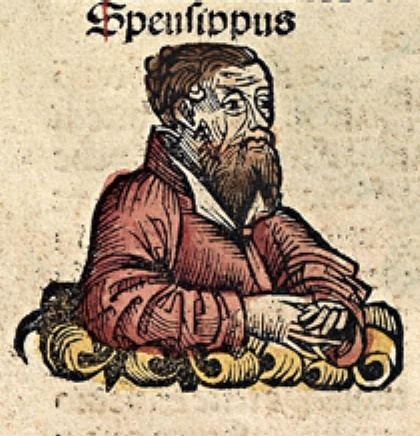
Speusippus, depicted as a medieval scholar in the Nuremberg Chronicle

Diogenes Laertius' list of Speusippus' works includes titles on justice, friendship, pleasure, and wealth. Clement of Alexandria (fr. 77 Tarán) reports that Speusippus considered happiness to be "a state that is complete in those things that are in accordance with nature, a condition desired by all human beings, while the Good aim at freedom from disturbance; and the virtues would be productive of happiness." This testimony suggests that Speusippus' ethics may have been an important background to ethical ideas of the Stoics (the will's conformity with nature) and Epicureans (compare "freedom from disturbance," aochlēsia, with the notion of ataraxia).

Modern scholars have detected a polemic between Speusippus and Eudoxus of Cnidus concerning the good. Eudoxus also accepts that the Good will be that at which all people aim, but identifies this as pleasure, as opposed to Speusippus' exclusive focus on moral goods. Texts of Aristotle and Aulus Gellius suggest that Speusippus insisted that pleasure was not a good, but that the Good was "in between the opposites of pleasure and pain." It is possible that the dispute between Speusippus and Eudoxus influenced Plato's Philebus (esp. 53c–55a).

Speusippus also seems to have developed further Plato's ideas of justice and of the citizen, and the fundamental principles of legislation.

== List of works ==
Diogenes Laërtius gives a selection of his works, adding that all his writings represent 43,475 lines of manuscript.

- Aristippus of Cyrene.
- On Wealth, one book.
- On Pleasure, one book.
- On Justice.
- On Philosophy.
- On Friendship.
- On the Gods.
- The Philosopher.
- A Reply to Cephalus.
- Cephalus.
- Clinomachus or Lysias.
- The Citizen.
- Of the Soul.
- A Reply to Gryllus.
- Aristippus.
- Criticism of the Arts, one book for each art.
- Memoirs, in the form of dialogues.
- Treatise on System, in one book.
- Dialogues on the Resemblances in Science, in ten books.
- Divisions and Hypotheses relating to the Resemblances.
- On Typical Genera and Species.
- A Reply to the Anonymous Work.
- Eulogy of Plato.
- Epistles to Dion, Dionysius and Philip.
- On Legislation.
- The Mathematician.
- Mandrobolus.
- Lysias.
- Definitions.
- Arrangements of Commentaries.

== See also ==
- Plato's unwritten doctrines, for debates in the Early Academy over Plato's esotericism
