= Callippus of Syracuse =

Tyrant of Syracuse from 354 to 352 BC

Callippus (/kəˈlɪp.əs/; Ancient Greek: Κάλλιππος Συρακούσιος; Sicilian: Cal(l)ippu) was a tyrant of Syracuse, Magna Graecia, who ruled briefly for thirteen months from 354 to 352 BC. He was a native Athenian who traveled with Dion to Sicily to capture Syracuse, whence Dion became the tyrant. Callippus then gained power by assassinating Dion, but ruled briefly before being ousted from power himself. Afterwards he commanded a band of mercenaries, who later killed him with the same sword that he used to kill Dion.

== Dion's lieutenant ==
Callippus was an Athenian who became a student of Plato. As the future tyrant of Syracuse, Dion, who was also a student of Plato, recruited Callippus as a member of his army which successfully invaded Syracuse. The army marched into Syracuse with 800 mercenaries and took control of the city, disposing of the previous tyrant, Dion’s nephew Dionysius II.

== Rise to power ==
In exile, Dionysius bribed Callippus to kill Dion, and Callippus accepted the offer. He was in a prime position to assassinate Dion, since most of Dion’s closest friends had been killed by Dionysius the Younger, and Callippus was his closest friend remaining.

Callippus used the money from Dionysius to bribe some of Dion’s troops to defect to him. He then won Dion’s trust by betraying some of the soldiers to Dion, who then enlisted Callippus as a secret agent to discover further plotters. In addition, whenever men told Dion that Callippus was maligning him, Dion simply thought that Callippus was acting as a spy.

Shortly afterwards, Dion’s only son fell from a window and died. Callippus spread a rumor saying that Dion had invited Dionysius’s son, Apollocrates to come to Syracuse as Dion’s successor. Dion’s wife, Arete, and sister, Aristomache, discovered Callippus’s plot against Dion, but Dion was still paralyzed with remorse from his son’s death, and refused to take action.

Arete and Aristomache further inquired about the plot against Dion, and when Callippus discovered their inquisitiveness, he approached them and told them that he was loyal, and that he would prove his loyalty. They told him to take the Great Oath, involving a ceremony in Persephone’s temple, which he took. Following the ceremony, Callippus broke his vow and stabbed Dion to death, whereupon Callippus took control of Syracuse.

== Rule ==
Following Dion’s assassination, Callippus sent a message to Athens bragging of his deeds, but despite his bluster, Callippus’s hold on Syracuse was tenuous. Friends of Dion attempted a revolt against him, but were unsuccessful. Callippus also had Arete and Aristomache thrown in prison, where Arete gave birth to Dion’s son. But due to his rising unpopularity, Callippus did not have Dion's son killed, despite the danger he posed.

== Fall ==
Several different accounts are given of how Callippus fell from power in Syracuse. According to Diodorus Siculus, Hipparinus, a son of Dionysius the Elder, a previous tyrant of Syracuse, attacked Syracuse with a fleet and army, after which Callippus fled from the city. According to Polyaenus, Hipparinus was staying in Leontini when Callippus had sent out his army. Hipparinus attacked while most of the army was gone and secured control of the city.

According to Plutarch, Callippus lost control of the city while he was absent, on an expedition to conquer Catana. But in Plutarch’s version Hipparinus is not mentioned, and instead Syracuse revolted against Callippus.

== Mercenary leadership and death ==
Callippus then attempted to conquer Messina instead, but his army was defeated. With his remaining troops he wandered around Sicily, but upon finding that he was unable to support himself, he travelled to Italy. There he conquered Rhegium, which had previously been controlled by Dionysius the Younger. But because he mistreated his mercenaries, his comrades Leptines II and Polyperchon stabbed him to death with a sword, reputed to be the same sword that killed Dion.

== Citations ==
Preceded by: Dion	Tyrant of Syracuse; 354–352 BC	Succeeded by: Hipparinus and Aretaeus
