= Philosopher king =

Hypothetical wise ruler described by Plato

The philosopher king is a hypothetical ruler in whom political skill is combined with philosophical knowledge. The concept of a city-state ruled by philosophers is first explored in Plato's Republic, written around 375 BC. Plato argued that the ideal state – one which ensured the maximum possible happiness for all its citizens – could only be brought into being by a ruler possessed of absolute knowledge, obtained through philosophical study. From the Middle Ages onwards, Islamic and Jewish authors expanded on the theory, adapting it to suit their own conceptions of the perfect ruler.

== In the Republic ==
The Republic is a Socratic dialogue. In the first two books, Socrates is challenged to give a definition of justice, which he proposes to accomplish by imagining how an ideal city-state would function. He suggests that the ideal state would be ruled over by a specially trained Guardian class, in whom a spirited nature would be combined with a philosophic disposition.

Socrates goes on to discuss various aspects of life within the state. In the fifth book, Socrates' interlocutors ask him whether the state he is describing could ever exist in reality. He replies that this could only happen on one condition:

Until philosophers are kings, or the kings and princes of this world have the spirit and power of philosophy ... cities will never have rest from their evils,—no, nor the human race, as I believe,—and then only will this our State have a possibility of life and behold the light of day.

Socrates clarifies this comment by distinguishing between true and false philosophers. The true philosopher (or "lover of wisdom") is one who loves "the truth in each thing", as opposed to those who only love the things themselves. This is a reference to Plato's belief that all particular things are only shadows of eternal Forms. Only the philosopher, therefore, is qualified to rule, as only the philosopher has knowledge of the absolute truth and is able to apply this knowledge for the good of the state.

Socrates next outlines the qualities which the ideal philosopher must possess, including truthfulness, temperance, justice, and a good memory. It is observed, however, that this ideal is in sharp contrast to reality, as many philosophers are "utter rogues", and the best of them are generally considered to be useless. Socrates explains the poor reputation of philosophers through the metaphor of the Ship of State, in which he compares Athenian democracy to a group of mutinous sailors vying with one another for control of the helm of a ship. The sailors, having themselves no knowledge of the art of navigation, deny that this is a necessary qualification for a pilot, and heap abuse on anyone who does not help them to achieve their goals. Socrates then acknowledges that many philosophers are indeed corrupt, but attributes this to the fact that they are brought up in a corrupt society. Only in the ideal state will a philosopher be able to achieve his full potential, "and be the saviour of his country, as well as of himself".

Having returned to the subject of the ideal state, Socrates elaborates on the way in which his Guardians would be educated, in order to lead them to a full and total knowledge of the Forms. This education will last thirty-five years, and prospective Guardians must then spend a further fifteen years occupying lesser offices, in order to gain experience of life. At the age of fifty, they will be qualified to rule. As philosophers, however, they will have no desire to engage in politics; they will do so only from a sense of duty.

Socrates concludes this portion of the dialogue by reaffirming that the ideal state is capable of being realised, but only if one or more philosophers were to somehow come to power in a city. He further suggests that if this were to happen, the quickest way for a philosopher king to bring the perfect state into existence would be to send away every inhabitant over the age of ten, so as to be able to bring up the younger generation in accordance with philosophic principles.

== History of interpretation ==
Aristotle, in his Politics, criticises many aspects of Plato's political theory, and sets out his own ideas about how a perfect city should be governed. Rather than proposing, as Plato does, the establishment of a ruling class, Aristotle argues that all citizens should take an equal share in the administration of the city. However, in one passage (book 3, ch. 13), Aristotle does write that if one or more people happened to be found who far excelled their fellow citizens in virtue, it would be against the natural order for such people to be subject to the rule of their inferiors, and they should therefore be made "kings in their state for life". While Aristotle here comes close to endorsing the philosopher-king ideal, he does not expressly state that this virtuous leader should be skilled in philosophy, and his writings more usually draw a sharp distinction between the theoretical wisdom of a philosopher and the political wisdom of a ruler.

When the Politics was translated into Latin in the thirteenth century, it became the foundational text for political philosophy in the Christian world, and Plato's ideas were marginalised in favour of an Aristotelian separation of temporal and spiritual authority. Islamic scholars, on the other hand, were heavily influenced by Plato's Republic, finding in the philosopher king a counterpart to the traditional figure of the "lawgiver-prophet". Al-Farabi, for example, followed Plato closely, writing that the ideal state was that which most carefully attended to the spiritual education of its citizens, and that its ruler must therefore have a highly developed understanding of the purpose of human existence. Where Al-Farabi departed from Plato was in asserting that the founder of the perfect state must not only be a philosopher but also a prophet, as the perfect law could only come from God. The founder's successors need not be prophets, but they must still be philosophers, able to correctly interpret and apply the received law.

Medieval Islamic philosophers had many opportunities to put their political theories into practice, as they often held positions in the royal court, with many even serving as viziers. Despite their belief in the philosopher king ideal, no Islamic philosophers are known to have attempted to seize power for themselves, apparently being contented with a subservient position. Al-Farabi makes a concession to this state of affairs when he writes that, since rulers possessed of all the necessary virtues are rare, it is possible for the kingship of the ideal state to be shared between two people, "one of whom is a philosopher and the other fulfils the remaining conditions".

The translation into Hebrew of the works of Al-Farabi and Averroes saw the concept of the philosopher king enter into Jewish political thought. Biblical figures such as Moses, Abraham and Solomon were held up as examples of ideal rulers, with Plato's theory undergoing further distortions in order to meet the needs of Jewish philosophers. The popularity of the idea finally declined during the seventeenth century, as influential authors such as Baruch Spinoza began to formulate more secular political philosophies modelled on the works of Machiavelli.

== Real-world examples ==
=== Dionysius and Dion ===
It appears from the Republic that Plato did not think it impossible for his ideal state to be established in reality, and he did make one notable attempt to educate a ruler in the principles of philosophy. In 367 BC, Dionysius II came to power in Syracuse, Sicily, under the supervision of his uncle Dion, who was a friend and disciple of Plato. Dion invited Plato to Syracuse to serve as an advisor to Dionysius, and Plato accepted. However, he probably hoped for nothing more than to exercise a moderating influence on the tyrant; he is unlikely to have believed that he could transform Dionysius into a true philosopher king. In the event, Dionysius proved an unwilling student, and nothing came of the endeavor.

Later, Dion attempted to seize power for himself, and was ultimately assassinated. In his possibly spurious Seventh Letter, Plato regretted Dion's death, and wrote that:

... if he had got the supreme power, ... he would then by every means in his power have ordered aright the lives of his fellow-citizens by suitable and excellent laws; and the thing next in order, which he would have set his heart to accomplish, was to found again all the States of Sicily and make them free from the barbarians ... If these things had been accomplished by a man who was just and brave and temperate and a philosopher, the same belief with regard to virtue would have been established among the majority which, if Dionysios had been won over, would have been established, I might almost say, among all mankind and would have given them salvation.

=== Other examples ===
Many other historical figures have been put forward as potential examples of philosopher kings. According to W. K. C. Guthrie and others, Plato's friend Archytas may have been the original inspiration behind the concept. Not only was Archytas a distinguished Pythagorean philosopher, he was also a skilled military general and a popular political leader, serving seven terms as strategos in the city of Tarentum, Italy.

Alexander the Great, as a student of Aristotle, has often been described as a philosopher king. His contemporary Onesicritus spoke of him as a "philosopher in arms", and the 1st-century Platonist Plutarch wrote in laudatory terms of his wisdom, generosity, temperance and courage. Plutarch's justification for calling Alexander a philosopher was that he had actualised principles which had previously only been spoken of as ideals and had "changed the brutish customs of countless nations". However, Alexander remains a controversial figure, as various historians have portrayed him very differently even into the modern day.

Roman emperor Marcus Aurelius is also frequently cited as a fulfilment of the philosopher king ideal. Ancient sources such as the Historia Augusta call him "the philosopher" and praise him for the clemency of his reign, while his Stoic tome Meditations is still revered as a literary monument to a philosophy of service and duty.

Further examples include:

- Julian (330–363), Roman emperor and Platonic philosopher, best known for renouncing Christianity and reviving Greco-Roman religion
- Khosrow I (512–579), ruler of Iran, admired in Persia and elsewhere for his character, virtues, and knowledge of Greek philosophy.
- Al-Ma'mun (786–833), Abbasid caliph at the peak of the Islamic Golden Age, famous for supporting the Graeco-Arabic translation movement, opening the largest research library of his time Bayt Al Hikmah to the public, patronizing many philosophers and polymaths such as Al-Khawarizmi in publishing his famous book known as "Algebra", patronizing the Mu'tazila as a rational Islamic theology movement, and succeeded in preserving many Greek manuscripts.
- Al-Mu'tasim (796–842), Abbasid caliph and military general, became Al-Ma'mun successor and continued his support for scientific endeavors during the Islamic Golden Age. He is known as the patron of philosophers and polymaths such as Al-Kindi and Al-Jahiz.
- Leo VI the Wise (866–912), Byzantine Emperor, military strategist and legislator. He finished writing the Byzantine code of law, known as the Basilika and authored the Tactica, an influential military manual. Christian philosophers like Arethas of Caesarea, famous for preserving the Meditations of Marcus Aurelius, flourished under his reign.
- Abu Yaqub Yusuf (1135–1184), Andalusian caliph and patron of Averroes.
- Frederick II (1194–1250), Holy Roman Emperor and King of Sicily, famous as a polymath and polyglot, a statesman and lawgiver, as well as a philosopher, poet, naturalist, and mathematician, who patronized a vibrant cosmopolitan court in 13th century Italy.
- Nezahualcoyotl (1402–1472), tlatoani of the city-state of Texcoco (part of the Aztec Triple Alliance) who cultivated a golden age of law, poetry, and culture for his city.
- Matthias Corvinus (1443–1490), king of Hungary and Croatia, who was influenced by the Italian Renaissance and strongly endeavored to follow in practice the model and ideas of the philosopher king as described in the Republic.
- Suleiman the Magnificent (1494–1566), Sultan of the Ottoman Empire, who was particularly known for his patronage of art and poetry.
- Frederick the Great (1712–1786), king of Prussia and a widely read political philosopher, and author of Anti-Machiavel, a rebuttal of Machiavelli's The Prince.
- Thomas Jefferson (1743–1826), Founding Father and President of the United States, author of the U.S. Declaration of Independence, and founder of the University of Virginia.
- Lee Kuan Yew (1923–2015), Prime Minister of Singapore, who oversaw the country's transformation from a poor country into a developed country with a high-income economy within a single generation through his leadership style of benevolent dictatorship.

== See also ==
- Benevolent dictator
- Enlightened absolutism
- Natural aristocracy
- Technocracy
- Theocracy
