= Sileraioi =

Ancient mercenary unit

The Sileraioi (Greek: Σιλεραίοι) were a group of ancient mercenaries of Sila, Calabria, Italy, most likely employed by the tyrant Dionysius I of Syracuse, though it is unknown at what time during Dionysus' reign and to what capacity the Sileraioi were employed. They began to issue coinage between the years 357 and 336 BC, and this coinage provides the bulk of the evidence of their existence. However, much can be inferred about the ruthless character of the Sileraioi based on what ancient authors wrote about Dionysus' mercenaries in general.

== Origin of name ==
There are a few possible explanations for the origin of the name “Sileraioi”. Some believe that they were named after the area of the Sila Mountains, in ancient Bruttium, and only left that area to come to Sicily when employed by Dionysius I of Syracuse. Others believe the group originated around the river Sele in Campania, and were therefore Campanian mercenaries, who also would have been employed by Dionysius I. A third and more recent theory places the origin of the Sileraioi in Lucania. However, the word Sileraioi is related to the paleo-mediterranean word sila, which means “channel in which water flows” and is the root of hundreds of names in Magna Graecia, and therefore the original location of the Sileraioi cannot be said to be Bruttium, Campania or Lucania definitively, without further archaeological evidence, although at this point modern scholarship points to Lucania as the most likely.

== Location ==
Some scholars believed that the Sileraioi had a city somewhere between Agrigento and Caltanissetta. The Sileraioi would have been hired by Dionysius I and when their service finished, remained in Sicily, either taking over some municipality by force or simply integrating into the local population. Dionysius I of Syracuse often granted citizenship to his mercenaries and was known for allotting land to them as well, and the Sileraioi were most likely entitled to the same benefits. More recent scholarship, however, supports the notion that there was never a city of the Sileraioi at all, but instead they were located on a natural hilltop stronghold now called Cozzo Mususino, which is between Alimena and Resuttano. The latter is supported by the amount of Sileraioi coins found at that location.

== Coinage ==
Eventually, the group organized themselves enough to mint coinage, as we see bronze coinage from Sicily with the inscription ΣΙΛΕΡΑΙΩΝ (it appears retrograde in the image). These coins were always over-struck on other coins of the area, usually bronze litras of Dionysius I. Some scholars believe that the entire series consists of two basic types. It is unclear what the Α-ΛΙΣ inscription on the coins' reverses refers to. If in retrograde as with the opposite side, it could be a reference to SILA, as mentioned above.

== Mercenaries and autocracy ==
Mercenaries such as the Sileraioi were essential to tyrants, in particular Dionysius I of Syracuse. Dionysius the Elder's victory over the democratic faction in Syracuse represents both the very worst and the very best of the mercenary leader. Dionysius’ career as a despot occurred after he was given six hundred personal mercenaries to guard his person after faking an attack on his own life. He was able to increase this guard to one thousand and gradually consolidated his power and established himself as a tyrant. He imposed his mercenaries on all parts of the polis community. Such an act would have truly wiped out any suggestion that democracy was still in force. His rule was “unconstitutional and illegitimate and could not fail to provoke rebellions among the partisans of democratic government”. It is not known at which point during his rule Dionysius employed the Sileraioi.

The demise of a prominent democratic polis in the Classical world and the subsequent tenure of Dionysius represented what would become a recurring norm in fourth-century Greece, thanks to the prevalence of mercenaries. The mercenary and the tyrant went hand-in-hand; Polybius for example noted how “the security of despots rests entirely on the loyalty and power of mercenaries”. Aristotle wrote how some form of ‘guard’ (viz. a personal army) is needed for absolute kingship, and for an elected tyrant a very particular number of professional soldiers should be employed; too few undermines the tyrant's power and too many threatens the polis itself. The philosopher notes how based on this observation, the people of Syracuse were warned to not let Dionysius conscript too many ‘guards’ during his reign.
