= Thearides =

Syracusan fleet commander

Thearides (Ancient Greek: Θεαρίδης) was a Syracusan from Magna Graecia, son of Hermocrates and brother of the Syracusan tyrant Dionysius I of Syracuse.

He is first mentioned in 390 BCE, when he was appointed by Dionysius to succeed his brother Leptines of Syracuse in the command of the fleet. The next year he commanded an expedition to the Aeolian Islands, where he captured ten ships belonging to the Rhegians. Again in 388 BCE he was chosen by his brother to conduct the procession which Dionysius sent to the Olympic festival.
