= Archytas (crater) =

Lunar impact crater

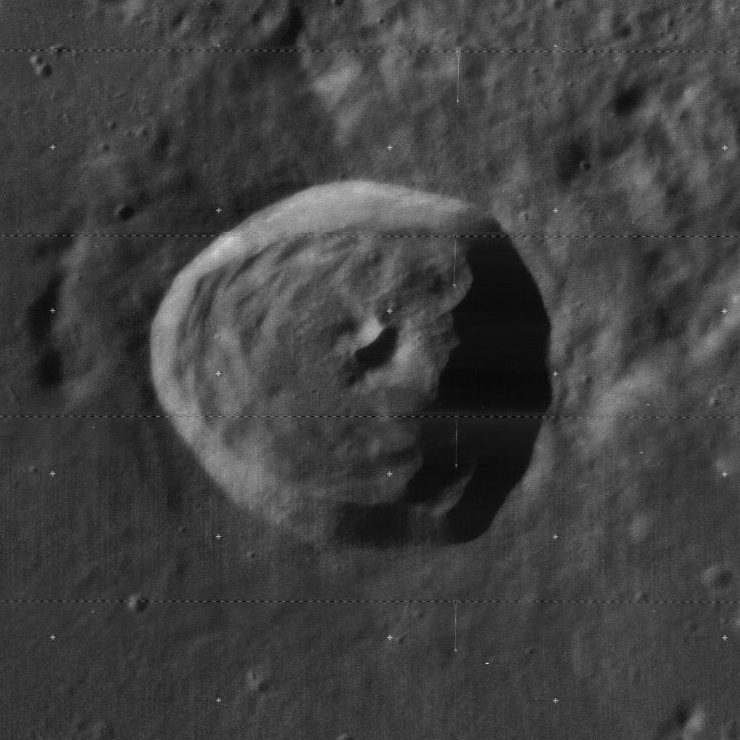
- Lunar Orbiter 4 image
- Coordinates: 58.7°N 5.0°E
- Diameter: 31.95 km (19.85 mi)
- Depth: 2.4 km
- Colongitude: 355° at sunrise
- Formation: Eratosthenian
- Eponym: Archytas

Archytas is a lunar impact crater that protrudes into the northern edge of Mare Frigoris. To the northwest is the comparably sized crater Timaeus, and the smaller Protagoras lies in the opposite direction to the southeast. Further to the southwest, beyond the opposite edge of the mare, is the dark-floored crater Plato.

On the lunar geologic timescale, Archytas dates to the Eratosthenian age. The rim of Archytas is sharp-edged and shows little appearance of erosion due to subsequent impacts. The outer wall is nearly circular, with a slight outward bulge in the southeast. The interior is rough, with a ring of material deposited at the base of the inner wall. Just to the east of the crater midpoint is a pair of central peaks.

The surface surrounding the crater is relatively smooth to the south due to the lava flows that formed the mare. The surface is more rugged to the north and northeast. The satellite crater Archytas B, located to the northwest of Archytas, forms a lava-flooded bay along the edge of the Mare Frigoris.

This crater is named after the Greek mathematician Archytas (435/410–360/350 BC). This designation was formally adopted by the International Astronomical Union in 1935.

== Satellite craters ==
By convention these features are identified on lunar maps by placing the letter on the side of the crater midpoint that is closest to Archytas.

Archytas	Latitude	Longitude	Diameter
B	61.3° N	3.2° E	36 km
D	63.5° N	11.8° E	43 km
G	55.6° N	0.5° E	7 km
K	62.6° N	7.7° E	15 km
L	56.2° N	0.9° E	5 km
U	62.8° N	9.2° E	8 km
W	61.2° N	5.2° E	6 km

Archytas G is a concentric crater, located on top of a large lunar dome in Mare Frigoris.

== Gallery ==
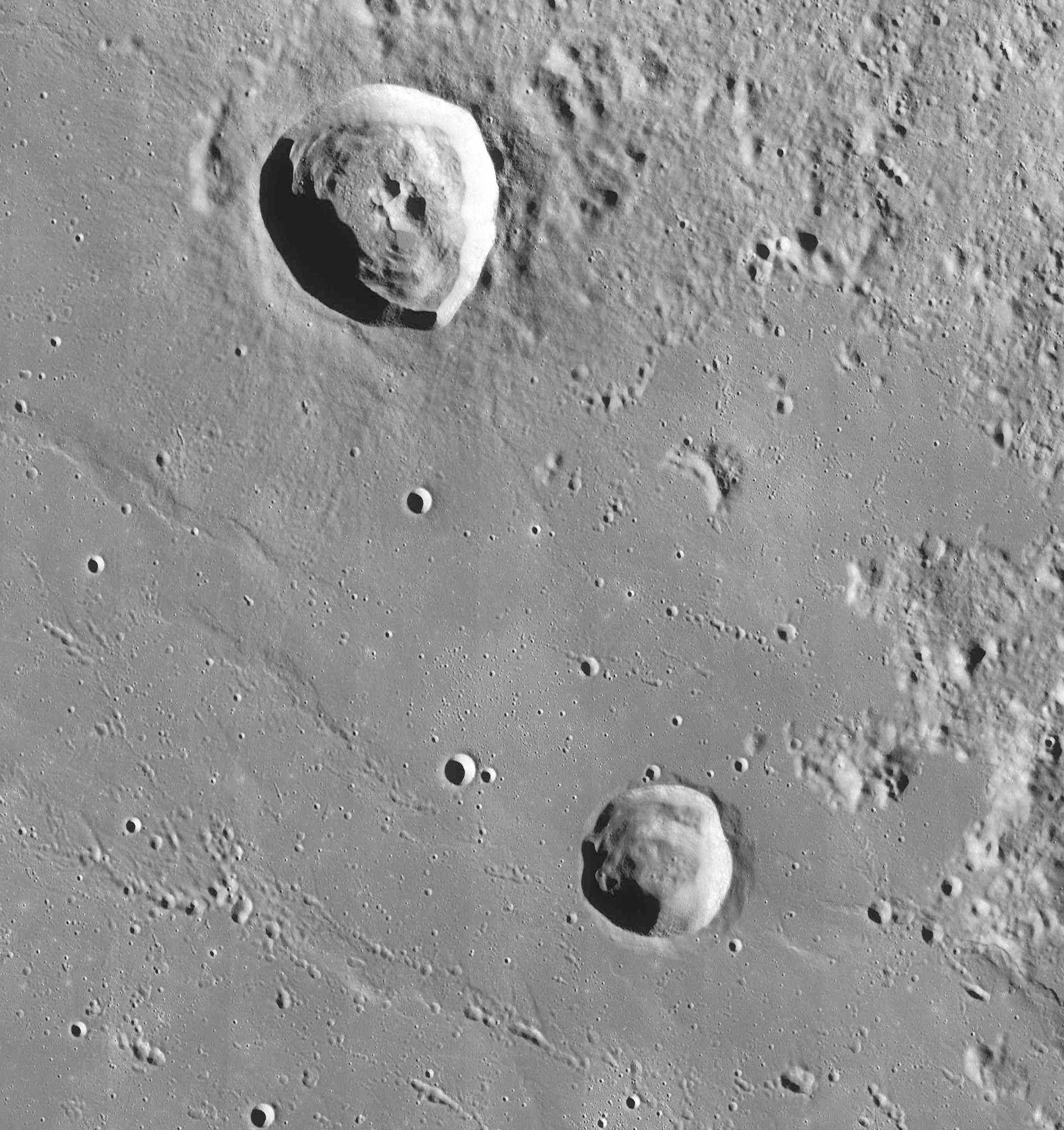
Archytas (upper left) and Protagoras (lower right). LRO image.

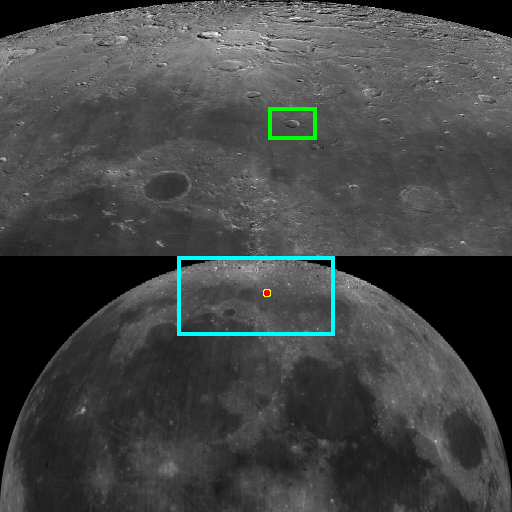
Location of Archytas
