= Protagoras (crater) =

Crater on the Moon

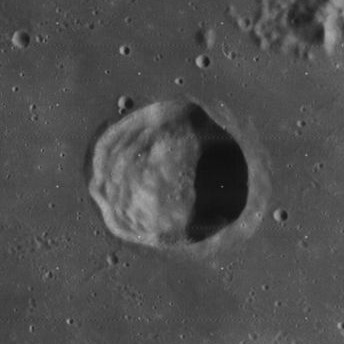
- Lunar Orbiter 4 image
- Coordinates: 56.0°N 7.3°E
- Diameter: 22 km
- Depth: 2.1 km
- Colongitude: 353° at sunrise
- Formation: Lower Imbrian
- Eponym: Protagoras

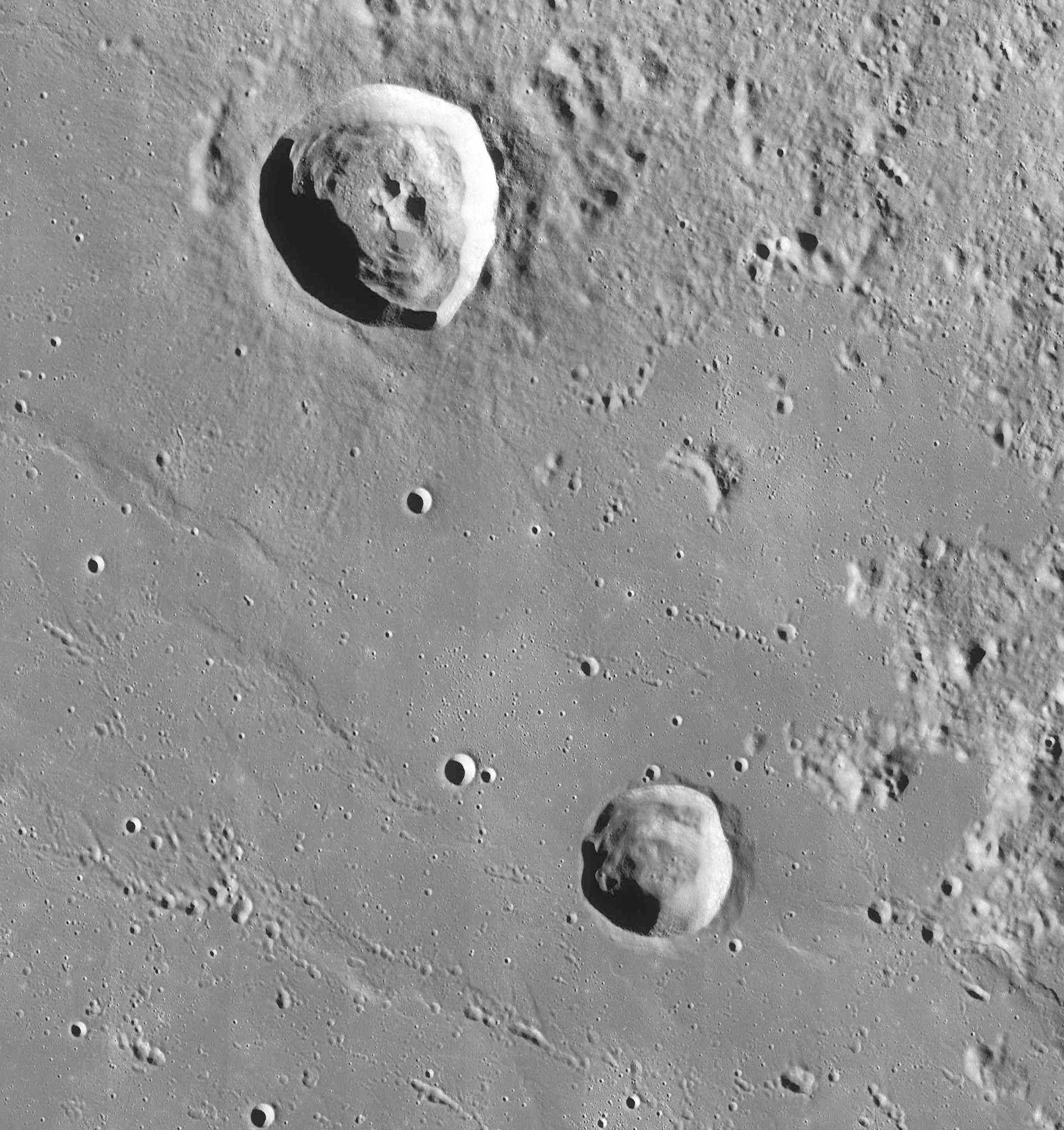
Archytas (upper left) and Protagoras (lower right). LRO image.

Protagoras is a lunar impact crater that is located on the Mare Frigoris in the northern part of the Moon. To the north-northwest is the slightly larger crater Archytas, and to the southeast is the prominent Aristoteles.

The rim of Protagoras is circular and rises above the surrounding flat terrain, although the rim dips down along the southwestern edge. The interior floor contains a few light markings but no formations of interest. There is an area of rough terrain just to the east of this crater, but the surroundings are otherwise level with only a few small craters in the vicinity.

The crater is named for the Greek sophist Protagoras of Abdera.

Protagoras is a crater of Lower (Early) Imbrian age.

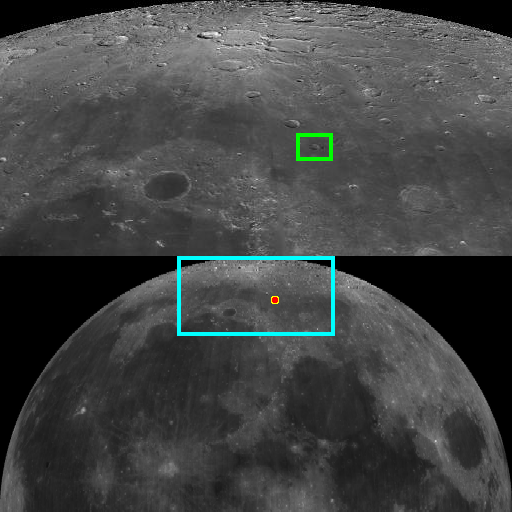
Location of the lunar crater Protagoras.

== Satellite craters ==
By convention these features are identified on lunar maps by placing the letter on the side of the crater midpoint closest to Protagoras.

Protagoras	Latitude	Longitude	Diameter
B	56.3° N	5.7° E	4 km
E	49.5° N	0.5° E	6 km
