= Timocrates of Syracuse =

Timocrates (Ancient Greek: Τιμοκράτης) of ancient Syracuse, Magna Graecia, commanded a squadron of twelve galleys, sent by Dionysius II of Syracuse to the aid of Sparta in 366 BCE. The arrival of this force enabled the Spartans to reduce Sellasia, which had revolted from them.
