= List of tyrants of Syracuse =

Dynamic list of ancient Greek rulers over Syracuse

Syracuse (Ancient Greek: Συρακοῦσαι; Sicilian: Tiranni di Sarausa) was an ancient Greek city-state, located on the east coast of Sicily, Magna Graecia. The city was founded by settlers from Corinth in 734 or 733 BC, and was conquered by the Romans in 212 BC, after which it became the seat of Roman rule in Sicily. Throughout much of its history as an independent city, it was governed by a succession of tyrants, with only short periods of democracy and oligarchy. While Pindar addressed the Deinomenids as kings (basileus) in his odes, it is not clear that this (or any other title) was officially used by any of the tyrants until Agathocles adopted the title in 304.

== Tyrants of Syracuse ==
=== Deinomenids (485–465) ===
- Gelon I (485 BC–478 BC)
- Hiero I (478 BC–466 BC)
- Thrasybulus (466 BC–465 BC)

Thrasybulus was deposed in 465 and Syracuse had a republican government for the next sixty years. This period is usually known as the Second Democracy (465-405). The extent to which Syracuse was a democracy in the same sense as Athens during this period is debated.

=== Dionysii (405–344) ===
- Dionysius the Elder (405 BC–367 BC)
- Dionysius the Younger (367 BC–356 BC)
- Dion (357 BC–355 BC)
- Calippus (355 BC–353 BC)
- Hipparinus (353 BC–c.350 BC)
- Nysaeus (c.350 BC–346 BC)
- Dionysius the Younger (restored, 346 BC–344 BC)

=== Timoleon (345–337) ===
- Timoleon (345 BC–337 BC)

Timoleon revived a republican form of government in Syracuse, which continued after his death. This period is usually known as the Third Democracy (337-317). The name is misleading; for at least some of the period Syracuse was run as an oligarchy.

=== Agathocles (317–289) ===
- Agathocles (317 BC–289 BC)

Numismatic evidence suggests that republican government may have existed for a few years between the death of Agathokles and Hicetas' assumption of power; this is sometimes referred to as the Fourth Democracy (289-287?). Nothing is known about it.

=== Interregnum (289–276) ===
- Hicetas (289 BC–280 BC)
- Thinion & Sosistratus (279 BC–277 BC)
- Pyrrhus of Epirus (278–276 BC)

=== Hieronids (275–214) ===
- Hiero II (275 BC–215 BC)
  - Gelo II (until 216 BC)
- Hieronymus (215 BC–214 BC)

In the aftermath of the devastating Roman defeat at the Battle of Cannae (216 BC), Hieronymus entered into an alliance with Hannibal, which would ultimately decide the city's fate politically. As a result of Syracuse's support for Carthage, the Romans under Marcus Claudius Marcellus began besieging the city in 214 BC. Hieronymus was assassinated shortly thereafter and a republican government restored (the Fifth Democracy) but the city fell to the Romans in 212 BC.

== See also ==
- List of ancient Greek tyrants
- List of mayors of Syracuse, Sicily
- Count of Syracuse
