= Apollocrates =

Son of the Syracusan tyrant Dionysius II

Apollocrates (Greek: Ἀπολλοκράτης) was the son of Dionysius II of Syracuse.

Two years after Dion and Heracleides conquered Syracuse in 357 BC, Apollocrates maintained control of the fortress of Ortygia. As supplies ran out, Apollocrates capitulated to Dion, who allowed him and his mother Doris to sail to join his father in Magna Graecia.

According to Theopompus, Book 39, F185: "Apollocrates the son of the tyrant Dionysius was undisciplined and an alcoholic."
