= Archytas =

4th-century BC Greek philosopher, mathematician, astronomer and statesman

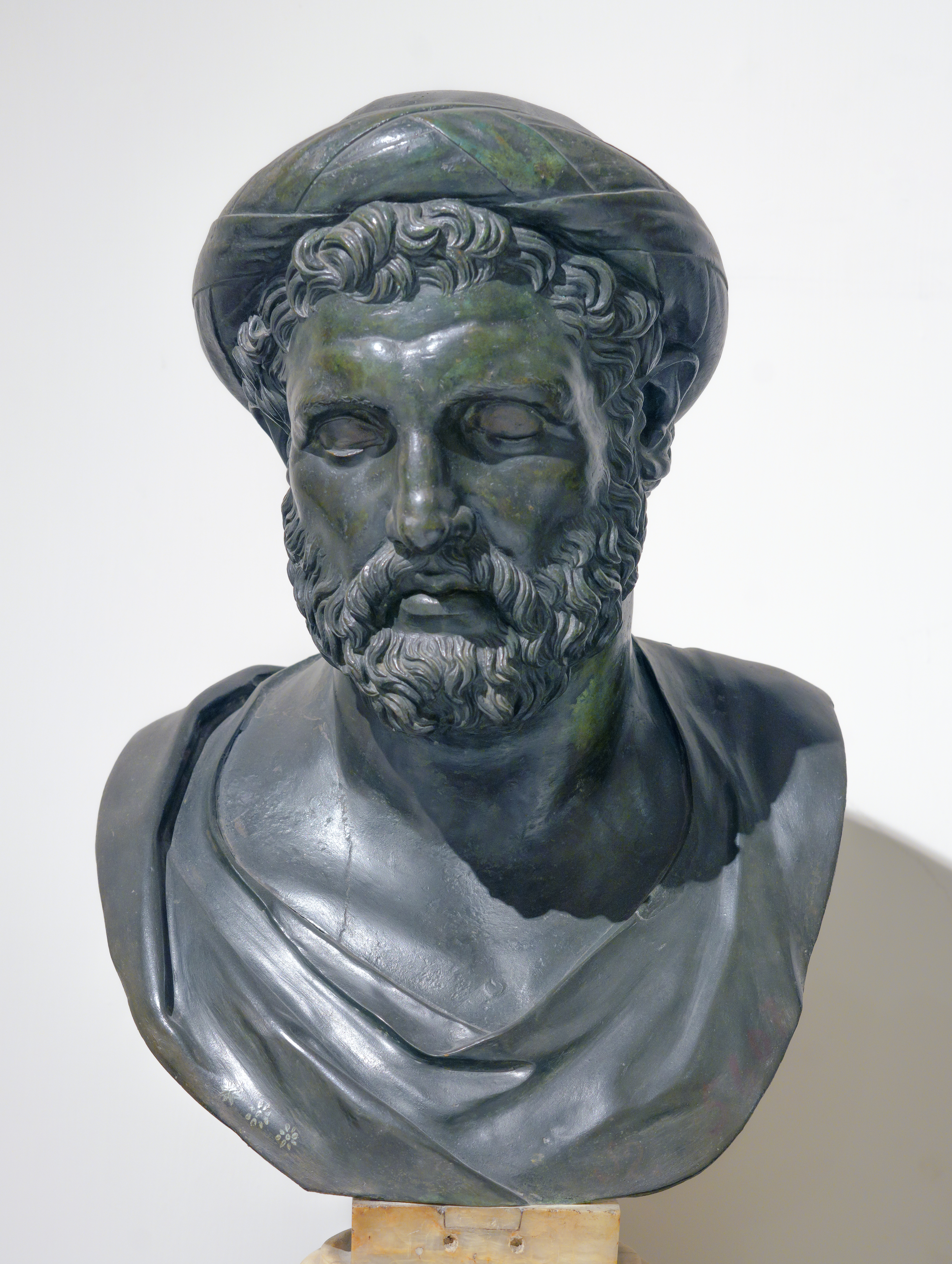
- Bust from Villa of the Papyri, Herculaneum, once identified as Archytas, now thought to be Pythagoras
- Born: 435/410 BC; Tarentum, Magna Graecia
- Died: 360/350 BC

Philosophical work
- Era: Classical Greek philosophy
- Region: Western philosophy
- School: Pythagoreanism
- Notable ideas: Doubling the cube Infinite universe

Archytas (/ˈɑːrkɪtəs/; Greek: Ἀρχύτας; 435/410–360/350 BC) was an Ancient Greek mathematician, music theorist, statesman, and strategist from the ancient city of Taras (Tarentum) in modern Apulia, Southern Italy. He was a scientist and philosopher affiliated with the Pythagorean school and famous for being the reputed founder of mathematical mechanics and a friend of Plato.

As a Pythagorean, Archytas believed that arithmetic (logistic), rather than geometry, provided the basis for satisfactory proofs, and developed the most famous argument for the infinity of the universe in antiquity.

== Life ==
Archytas was born in Tarentum, a Greek city in the Italian Peninsula that was part of Magna Graecia, and was the son of Hestiaeus. He was presumably taught by Philolaus, and taught mathematics to Eudoxus of Cnidus and to Eudoxus' student, Menaechmus.

Politically and militarily, Archytas appears to have been the dominant figure in Tarentum in his generation, somewhat comparable to Pericles in Athens a half-century earlier. The Tarentines elected him strategos ("general") seven years in a row, a step that required them to violate their own rule against successive appointments. Archytas was allegedly undefeated as a general in Tarentine campaigns against their southern Italian neighbors.

In his public career, Archytas had a reputation for virtue as well as efficacy. The Seventh Letter, traditionally attributed to Plato, asserts that Archytas attempted to rescue Plato during his difficulties with Dionysius II of Syracuse. Some scholars have argued that Archytas may have served as one model for Plato's philosopher king, and that he influenced Plato's political philosophy as expressed in The Republic and other works.

== Works ==
Archytas is said to be the first ancient Greek to have spoken of the sciences of arithmetic (logistic), geometry, astronomy, and harmonics as kin, which later became the medieval quadrivium. He is thought to have written a great number of works in the sciences, but only four fragments are generally believed to be authentic.

According to Eutocius, Archytas was the first to solve the problem of doubling the cube (the so-called Delian problem) with an ingenious geometric construction. Before this, Hippocrates of Chios had reduced this problem to the finding of two mean proportionals, equivalent to the extraction of cube roots. Archytas' demonstration uses lines generated by moving figures to construct the two proportionals between magnitudes and was, according to Diogenes Laërtius, the first in which mechanical motions entered geometry. (Note: Plato blamed Archytas for his contamination of geometry with mechanics: And therefore Plato himself dislikes Eudoxus, Archytas, and Menaechmus for endeavoring to bring down the doubling the cube to mechanical operations; for by this means all that was good in geometry would be lost and corrupted, it falling back again to sensible things, and not rising upward and considering immaterial and immortal images, in which God being versed is always God.) The topic of proportions, which Archytas seems to have worked on extensively, is treated in Euclid's Elements, where the construction for two proportional means can also be found.

Archytas named the harmonic mean, important much later in projective geometry and number theory, though he did not discover it. He proved that superparticular ratios (Note: Superparticular ratios are integer ratios of the form (n + 1)/ n , where n is some natural number; they are the "atoms" of mathematical theories of musical scales and tuning, and were extensively used by musicologists of the Greek classical period, of which Archytas was one among several. Examples of superparticular ratios seen frequently in musical analysis of intonation even to the present day are 81 / 80 , 25 / 24 , 16 / 15 , 10 / 9 , 9 / 8 , 6 / 5 , 5 / 4 , 4 / 3 , 3 / 2 , and 2/ 1 .) cannot be divided by a mean proportional – an important result in ancient harmonics. Ptolemy considered Archytas the most sophisticated Pythagorean music theorist, and scholars believe Archytas gave a mathematical account of the musical scales used by practicing musicians of his day.

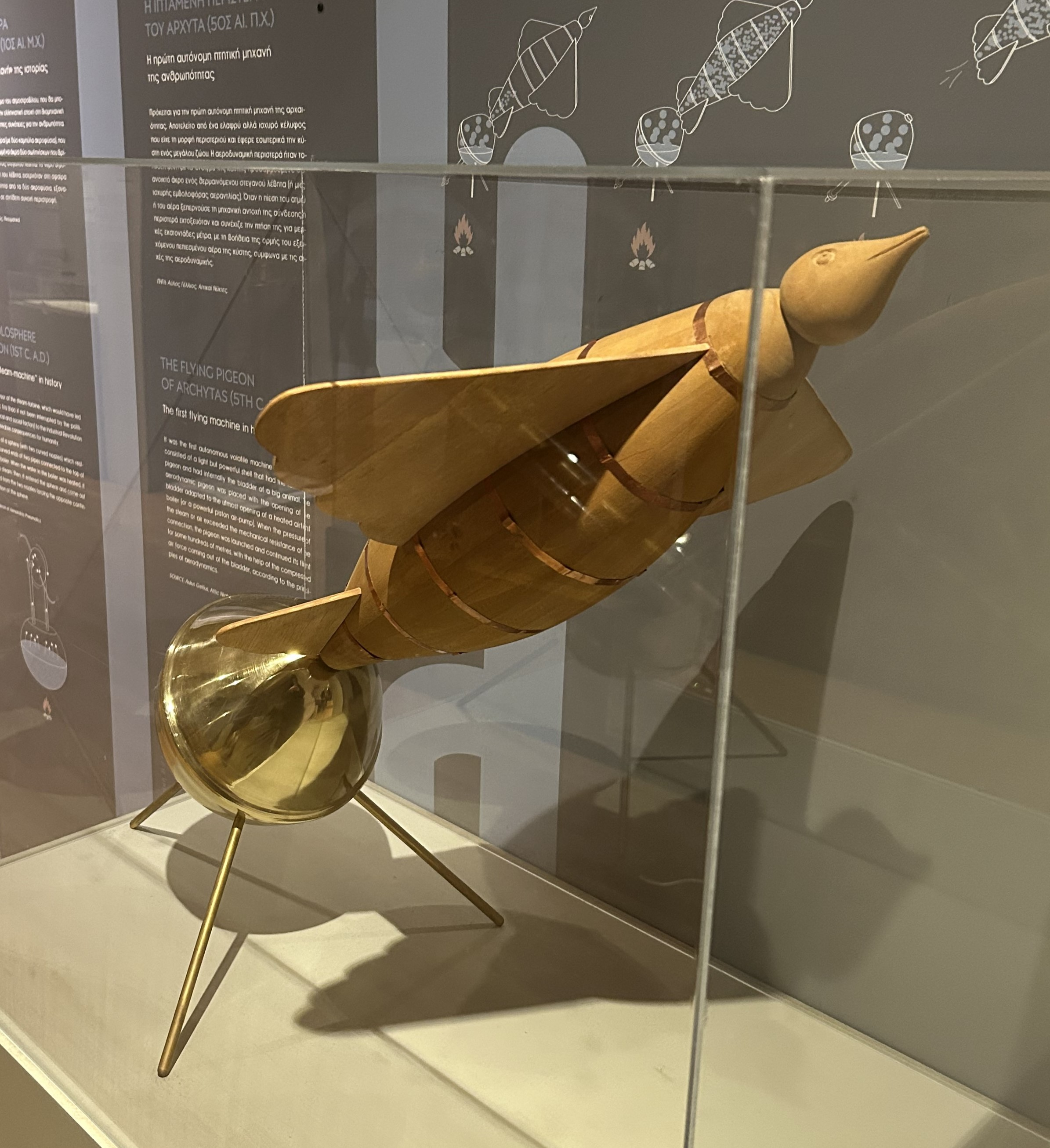
A reconstruction of Archytas' flying dove (5th c. B.C.), in Kotsanas Museum of Ancient Greek Technology, Athens, Greece.

Later tradition regarded Archytas as the founder of rational and mathematical mechanics. Vitruvius includes him in a list of twelve authors who wrote works on mechanics. T.N. Winter presents evidence that the pseudo-Aristotelian Mechanical Problems might have been authored by Archytas and later mis-attributed to Aristotle.

Archytas invented a baby rattle and the ratchet (raganella, or "tree frog" in Italian), and is credited with inventing the screw and the pulley. Tradition also has it that he built the so-called "Archytas's flying dove", a mechanical flying dove. The sole mention of this from antiquity comes some five centuries after Archytas, when Aulus Gellius discusses a report by his mentor Favorinus:

Archytas made a wooden model of a dove with such mechanical ingenuity and art that it flew; so nicely balanced was it, you see, with weights and moved by a current of air enclosed and hidden within it. About so improbable a story I prefer to give Favorinus' own words: "Archytas the Tarentine, being in other lines also a mechanician, made a flying dove out of wood. Whenever it lit, it did not rise again."

Aulus Gellius views the reporting of the tradition as problematic, since it spreads implausible beliefs even if accompanied by skepticism.

A lunar crater named after Archytas is the Archytas crater, characterized by the Archytas Rima, and a main-belt asteroid discovered in 1997: 14995 Archytas.
