= Carystius =

Greek grammarian

Carytius of Pergamum (Greek: Καρύστιος) was an ancient Greek grammarian who lived at the end of the 2nd century BCE, all of whose works are now lost. Among his works were Historical Notes (Ἱστορικα ὑπομνήματα), On the Dramatic Poets (Περι διδασκαλιῶν), and On Sotades (Περι Σωτάδου). The first of these was used by Athenaeus in composing the Deipnosophistae, in which many of its passages are preserved.
