= Philistus =

Greek historian (c. 432 – 356 BC)

Philistus Φίλιστος
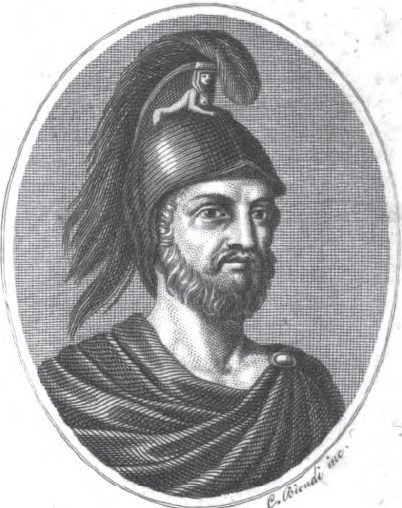
- Born: c. 432 BC; Syracuse
- Died: 356 BC (aged c. 76)

Philistus (Ancient Greek: Φίλιστος; c. 432 – 356 BC), son of Archomenidas, was a Greek historian from Sicily.

== Life ==
Philistus was born in Syracuse around the time the Peloponnesian War began. He was a faithful supporter of the elder Dionysius, and commander of the citadel. Cicero, who had a high opinion of his work, called him the miniature Thucydides (pusillus Thucydides). He was admitted by the Alexandrian critics into the canon of historiographers, and his work was highly valued by Alexander the Great. His works were continued by the later historian Athanas of Syracuse.

Philistus was quite wealthy. Before his rise to power, Dionysius criticized the generals of Syracuse on their poor performance against the Carthaginians, and was fined by the assembly for his seditious language. Philistus stepped in to pay Dionysius' fines, with the promise to continue paying them so long as the council saw fit to issue them. It was through Philistus' support that Dionysius was able to rise to power and control Syracuse.

In 386 BC, without consulting the tyrant, Philistus married the daughter of Dionysius' brother Leptines. Dionysius feared that Leptines and Philistus would use the marriage as the basis of an alliance against him, and exiled both men from Syracuse. Philistus settled at Thurii but afterwards moved to Adria, where he remained until the death of Dionysius in 367 BC. During his stay at Adria, Philistus occupied himself with the composition of his history of Sicily in eleven books. The first part comprised the history of the island from the earliest times to the capture of Agrigentum by the Carthaginians (406 BC); the second, the history of the elder and the younger Dionysius (down to 363 BC). From this point the work was carried on by Athanas.

Philistus was then recalled by the younger Dionysius, whom he persuaded to dismiss Plato and Dion. When Dion set sail from Zacynthus with the object of liberating Syracuse in 356 BC, Philistus was entrusted by Dionysius II with the command of the fleet. After a lengthy sea battle, his ship was surrounded. Philistus took his own life to avoid retribution from his countrymen.
