= Doris of Locri =

Doris (Ancient Greek: Δωρίς) of Epizephyrian Locris was the daughter of the rich Locrian, Xenetus, and became wife of the Sicilian tyrant Dionysius I of Syracuse in about 406 BC, and mother of Dionysius II of Syracuse.

She died before her husband, who seems to have lamented her in one of his tragedies.
