= Dion of Syracuse =

4th-century BC Tyrant of Syracuse

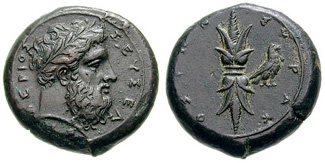

Dion (/ˈdaɪɒn, ən/; Greek: Δίων ὁ Συρακόσιος; 408–354 BC), tyrant of Syracuse in Magna Graecia, was the son of Hipparinus, and brother-in-law of Dionysius I of Syracuse. A disciple of Plato, he became Dionysius I's most trusted minister and adviser. However, his great wealth, his belief in Platonism and his ambition aroused the suspicions of Dionysius I's son and successor, Dionysius II. An indiscreet letter from Dion to the Carthaginians led to his banishment. Settling in Athens, he lived a prosperous life until Dionysius II dispossessed him of his estates and income. Landing in Sicily in 357 BC, he was successful in conquering Syracuse (other than the citadel). However, Dion soon quarrelled with the radical leader Heraclides and was forced into exile. Recalled in 355 BC, he became master of the whole city but alienated the population with his imperious behaviour and financial demands. His supporters abandoned him, and he was assassinated. Dion's attempts to liberate Sicily only brought the island political and social chaos which lasted for nearly 20 years.

== Family ==
Dion was the son of the Syracusan statesman Hipparinus, who had served with Dionysius I in the Syracusan army. Hipparinus' other children were Megacles and Aristomache. Aristomache married Dionysius I, who also married Doris of Locris at the same time. Although Dion's sister was popular with her fellow Syracusans, it was Doris who gave birth to Dionysius I's heir Dionysius II.

Aristomache had four children. Of these children, Sophrosyne married Dionysius II and Arete married Dion (with their son being called Hipparinus).

== Advisor to Dionysius I ==
As a trusted advisor to Dionysius I, Dion was given the most important diplomatic assignments. Dion excelled in managing the embassies that dealt with Carthage. Dionysius I was so satisfied with Dion's role as advisor that eventually Dion was authorized to withdraw money from the Syracusan treasury. The tyrant demanded, however, to be informed daily when he did so. Despite this requirement, Dion became extremely rich and his residence was magnificently furnished. Nonetheless, Dion occasionally criticized Dionysius I.

Since his youth, Dion had excelled in intellectual activities, particularly philosophy. In 387 BC he induced Dionysius I to invite Plato to Syracuse. Dion joined Plato's philosophical school, where he excelled as a disciple, and sought to inculcate Platonic maxims into the thoughts of Dionysius I. He arranged a meeting between the philosopher and the despot, which ended in a quarrel after Plato spoke out against tyrannical leaders. Plato escaped assassination by the agents of Dionysius I, but ended up being sold as an Athenian slave in Aegina. Despite this disagreement over Plato, Dion and Dionysius I's close relationship continued as before.

Dionysius I was on his deathbed when Dion attempted to discuss the succession with him. Dion hoped that Dionysius I would hand over the rule of Syracuse to him or to his family. However, his attempt to influence Dionysius I was stopped by Dionysius I's doctors who supported the younger Dionysius II. On hearing of Dion's plans, Dionysius II then deliberately poisoned his father, who was unable to utter another word before dying.

== Dion and Dionysius II ==
Dionysius I had dreaded that anyone might depose him treacherously. He had, therefore, cloistered his son Dionysius II inside the Syracusan acropolis so, as he grew up, he lacked the knowledge, capabilities, political skills or personal strength expected of a future leader of men. When Dionysius I died in 367 BC, he was succeeded by Dionysius II. (References to Dionysius in this article hereafter refer to Dionysius II unless otherwise specified.) As an adult Dionysius was given to libertine practices. Cornelius Nepos was of the view that Dionysius lacked his father’s strength of character and he paid too much attention to unscrupulous advisers who wished to discredit Dion.

When he succeeded as tyrant of Syracuse, his entire court was composed of by licentious youngsters, who were completely disengaged from their political duties. The Syracusan institutions thus began to collapse. With his extensive political experience, Dion effectively ruled the city state. Soon, the people of Syracuse formed the view that Dion was the only one who might save the city.

In Dionysius' court, Dion proposed a response to the continuing Carthaginian threat. Dion offered either to travel to Carthage (to seek a diplomatic solution) or to furnish Syracuse with 50 new triremes with his own money to fight the Carthaginians. Although Dionysius was delighted by these suggestions, his courtiers resented Dion's interventions. They suggested to Dionysus that Dion was trying to oust him in favour of the line of his sister Aristomache.

Dion concluded that educating Dionysius would be the key to resolving Syracuse's problems. With his philosophical training, Dion began teaching him about philosophical principles and the importance of good governance with the aim of making him a philosopher king. Such lessons sparked Dionysius' interest, so Plato was invited again to Syracuse. The experiment, in spite of a promising beginning, failed, with Dion's opponents gaining influence over Dionysius, leading to the philosopher Philistus being recalled (after he had been banished by the elder Dionysius) and then leading the opposition to Dion.

Facing increasing opposition to his plans, Dion began developing a plot, with generals Heracleides and Theodotes, to overthrow Dionysius. They agreed that they would wait in the hope of political reform, although they would oust Dionysius if this did not happen. Eventually Dion agreed with Heracleides to install a full democracy, by his wealthy patrician birth, he disliked this form of government.

Nonetheless, Plato arrived and was welcomed with much enthusiasm. Plato's conversations with Dionysius were said to have led to significant changes in Dionysius' views and behaviour, who, became sober and attentive, whereas his court continued its libertine practices. Then, during a traditional sacrifice, Dionysius openly stated that he did not wish to be a tyrant any longer.

== Banishment ==
When Dionysius expressed the view that he no longer wished to rule as a tyrant, this alarmed Philistus and his supporters and they campaigned intensively against Dion. They insisted to Dionysius that Dion was the greatest of deceivers, who was intending to seize the realm for his own nephews. Dionysius believed their arguments so he adopted a hostile attitude towards Dion.

The situation reached a crisis point when Dionysius and Philistus intercepted a letter which had been sent by Dion to the Carthaginians. In that letter, Dion recommended that the Carthaginians should consult him regarding a peace agreement, because he would provide all of Syracuse's demands to them. Fearing a plot between Carthage and Dion and his supporters, Dionysius feigned a renewed friendship with Dion. They walked to the seashore where the despot showed the incriminating letter to Dion and, without giving Dion the opportunity to defend himself, immediately forced Dion into exile. Dion eventually made his way to Athens.

Plato was confined inside the acropolis and received excellent treatment as an important guest, so he would not follow Dion. Later, when war with Carthage restarted, Dionysius allowed the philosopher to depart Syracuse, promising Plato that he would allow Dion to return to Syracuse during the next summer.

Thanks to these events, there was growing speculation in Syracuse that Aristomache, who was popular with her fellow citizens, would attempt to seize the power. Dionysius became aware of these sentiments and he attempted to address the situation. Publicly, he explained that Dion was temporarily in Athens so that he wouldn't provoke some violent backlash against Dionysius. Dion was allowed to hold onto his Syracusan estate so he was still receiving his usual revenues. Furthermore, Dionysius handed two ships to Dion's relatives so they could send his possessions after him to Athens.

Thus, Dion lived amongst the Athenian high society, dwelling with the patrician Athenian Calippus of Syracuse with whom he had become acquainted during the celebrations of the Eleusinian Mysteries. Additionally, Dion purchased a rural residence for his leisure. His closest friend was Speusippus.

Dionysius delayed Dion's return until the end of the war with Carthage. Dionysius recommended to Plato that Dion should not publicly criticise the Syracusan regime. Dion obeyed, staying within the Athenian Academy and studying philosophy.

Later Dion did begin travelling throughout Greece meeting many local statesmen. Dion was regarded as a celebrity and many Greek cities welcomed him. For instance, the Spartans endowed him with citizenship, although the city state was at war with Thebes and was allied with Dionysius.

== Rebellion ==
Eventually, Dionysius decided to seize all of Dion's properties in Syracuse and stopped him receiving revenue from his estates. Dionysius tried to mend his image by forcing Plato to visit him in Syracuse through public threats against Dion. The celebrated philosopher returned to Syracuse, but soon he and Dionysius began arguing bitterly about Dion's fate. The philosopher was jailed until an Athenian embassy arranged for his release. In his anger, Dionysus sold Dion's estate (keeping the proceeds) and compelled Dion's wife (and niece) Arete to marry the tyrant's close adviser, Timocrates.

In response, Dion sought to start a revolt in Syracuse against Dionysius and his supporters. Dion's closest friends advised him that in Syracuse, the population could be expected to enthusiastically join Dion's revolt, if only he could get to the city. They told him that Dion did not need to bring either weapons or soldiers.

Nevertheless, Dion managed to gather from his Greek supporters 800 soldiers who gathered on the Greek island of Zacynthus. Dion assured the leaders of the mercenaries that they would be made commanders once they defeated Dionysius.

In 357 BC, Dion's fleet sailed for Sicily. As his coming was expected, the Admiral Philistus had a fleet in Italian coastal waters ready to waylay him. So Dion sailed straight across the open sea. After 13 days, Dion's fleet reached Sicily at Pachynus. However, despite his own helmsman's advice, Dion sailed further along the southern coast of Sicily where the fleet was hit by a storm and nearly smashed into pieces against the rocks near Cercina, in northern Africa. The fleet had to wait for five days until a favourable southerly wind brought it back to Sicily. Dion was then able to land in Carthaginian territory. As he was a personal friend of the governor Synalus of Heraclea Minoa, the Carthaginians offered lodging and plentiful supplies to Dion's expedition.

Having learnt that Dionysius had sailed to Caulonia on the Italian peninsula with 80 ships, Dion's soldiers insisted on action. So Dion led his troops towards Syracuse. On the road through Agrigento, Gela, Camarina and the region surrounding Syracuse, they were joined by 5,000 Sicilians who wished to join the revolt. Near Akrai, Dion spread rumours that he would be attacking both Lentini and Campania. Dionysius' soldiers from these areas deserted Timocrates' forces to defend their respective towns. Then, during the night, Dion ordered the expedition to advance, and at daybreak, Dion launched his attack.

With the news of the arrival of Dion, the people of Syracuse slew the tyrant's supporters and Timocrates had to flee. Dion led his army into Syracuse. He wore brilliant armour and a garland crowned his head. Dion was accompanied by Megacles and Callipus. The local community leaders greeted them. Dion proclaimed that Dionysius was now deposed.

A week later, Dionysius returned to Syracuse and, protected by his loyal fleet, managed to gain entry into the Syracusan island acropolis which had not been captured as it was guarded by a large garrison loyal to the tyrant. Dionysus attempted negotiating with Dion but Dion responded by saying that the now free Syracusans should decide.

Dionysius' proposals were spurned by the people and Dion suggested his surrender. Dionysus accepted this suggestion and he invited a local embassy to come to his palace to discuss the details. However, it was a deception on Dionysius' part and Dion's representatives were immediately confined after entering into the palace.

The next day, Dionysius' army surprised and overwhelmed the many besieging Syracusans who retreated in utter disorder. Because of the confusion, Dion was unable to issue orders more generally, so he and his men charged against Dionysius' troops. Dion was injured and ended on the ground but he was rescued by his men. Dion mounted a horse and was reunited with supporters. Dion's foreign mercenaries had superior fighting skills and forced Dionysius' men to retreat back into the acropolis.

== Leadership of Syracuse ==
Following Dion's defeat of Dionysius' forces, Dion was elected to lead Syracuse (with his brother). Dionysius and his supporters were confined to the citadel.

With his long connection with the former tyranny, it soon became clear to the people of Syracuse that Dion's political views were conservative and he did not favour the introduction of the democratic reforms sought by many of Syracuse's citizens. Dion was not a man who could hold the affections of the people, for he repelled men with his haughtiness. He was also seen as too keen to direct the Syracusans on how they were to use their freedom. As a result, the Syracusans started to distrust Dion's intentions.

Dion soon fell out with Heracleides who formed his own political party. Heracleides was appointed admiral by the Syracuse assembly which increased his influence in the city. However, Dion undid this act on the grounds that his own consent was needed and then came forward himself to propose Heracleides for the role of admiral.

Heracleides kept arguing in favour of democratic reform. Later, when Philistus returned from Italy with his squadron, Heracleides led a Syracusan fleet in a battle in which Philistus' fleet was defeated and Philistus was executed. The rivalry peaked after Heracleides failed to prevent Dionysius' subsequent escape from Syracuse, with Dionysius' son Apollocrates being left to command the citadel.

Heracleides then proposed to the popular assembly that:

- Syracusan land should be equally redistributed amongst the citizens
- the foreign officers should lose their salary
- new commanders should be appointed

Dion opposed such plans but the Syracusans reacted decisively against what they saw as his oppressive government (which relied to a great extent on unpopular foreign mercenaries). The Syracusans deposed him from the post of general and appointed 25 new generals, among them Heracleides. They also refused to pay the Greek mercenaries who had come with Dion to Syracuse. While Dion and his mercenaries could have turned against the Syracusans, Dion decided to abandon Syracuse and with his 3000 foreign mercenaries moved to Leontini.

At Leontini, Dion was well received and his foreign mercenaries were made local citizens. There, the Sicilian congress held a meeting, denouncing Syracuse, but the Syracusans responded that they preferred their actual liberties instead of a continuation of tyranny.

== Regaining power in Syracuse ==
With the departure of Dion and his mercenaries, the Syracusans decided to lay siege to the island fortress where Dionysius' son, Apollocrates, and his garrison of mercenaries resided. However, just as they were about to attack, reinforcements arrived led by a Campanian from Naples, Nypsius, who sailed his fleet into Syracuse's Great Harbour.

At first the Syracusans seemed to be winning after Heracleides put out to sea and won a sea fight against the fleet supporting Nypsius. On the news of this victory, the people of Syracuse went wild with joy and spent the night drinking. The next day, while all in Syracuse were asleep, Nypsius and his troops issued from the gates of the island citadel and took control of key parts of the city and pillaged the city at will.

The Syracusans were unable to offer effective resistance, so they sent an embassy to Leontini to meet with Dion. In response, Dion announced that his soldiers should prepare to march towards Syracuse on that same night.

When he learnt about Dion's imminent arrival, Nypsius ordered to his men to burn the city. During that night, the city of Syracuse burned while many of its citizens were slain. The next day, Dion led his troops through the city cheered by the local people. However, Nypsius' troops had hidden behind the destroyed palisade of the acropolis and the liberating soldiers were unable to reach them. The Syracusans spontaneously decided to charge the enemy, which ended when Nypsius and his men retreated back into the citadel where many of Nypsius' soldiers were then captured. Nypsius somehow managed to escape from the city. Not long after, Dionysius' son Apollocrates, weary of the long siege, surrendered the island citadel to Dion and Dion's sister Aristomache, his wife Arete and the young Hipparinus were freed.

The Syracusan assembly 'supplicated Dion as a god with prayers' when he returned to Syracuse (Plutarch, Life of Dion 29.2). However, Diodorus (16.20.6) described these honours as heroic.

During the next days, most of the opponents of Dion fled. Amongst the few who remained was Heracleides who sought Dion's pardon. Dion's foreign mercenaries suggested that he should be executed. However, Dion pardoned him and agreed to the arrangement where Dion would be general with full power on land while Heracleides would remain admiral by sea.

The Syracusans began insisting, once again, about redistributing land and restoring democracy. However, according to Bury, Dion thought democracy was as bad a form of government as tyranny. Instead he hoped to create a Platonic state and establish an aristocracy with some democratic limitations and with a king and a senate made up of aristocrats. Also, the people of Syracuse wished to see the citadel of the tyrant demolished, but Dion allowed it to remain. Dion seemed to have no intention of allowing the Syracusans to manage their own affairs. His authority was now only limited by his joint command with Heracleides.

Heracleides refused joining the aristocratic senate even after an invitation of Dion and, again, the populist leader began conspiring. He protested because Dion had not destroyed the acropolis and because he had brought in foreign politicians. At last, Dion was persuaded to consent to having Heracleides assassinated at his own home.

Although Dion led the funeral for the popular leader, the assassination was quite resented by the people of Syracuse.

== Assassination ==
Among those who had come with Dion from Greece to help liberate Syracuse was a pupil of Plato named Calippus.

From his exile, Dionysius had offered a bribe to Calippus to kill Dion and Calippus had accepted the offer. Calippus used the money from Dionysius to bribe some of Dion’s troops to defect to him. He then won Dion’s trust by betraying some of these soldiers to Dion, who then enlisted Calippus as a secret agent to discover further plotters. So whenever Dion was told that Calippus was undermining him, Dion simply thought that Calippus was acting in his role as a spy.

Shortly afterwards, Dion’s only son fell from a window and died. Dion’s wife, Arete, and sister, Aristomache, discovered Calippus’ plot against Dion, but Dion was still paralysed with remorse from his son’s death, and refused to take action.

Arete and Aristomache continued their enquiries into Calippus' plot against Dion, and when Calippus discovered their inquisitiveness, he approached them and told them that he was loyal and that he would prove his loyalty. They told him to take the Great Oath, involving a ceremony in Persephone’s temple, which he took. Following the ceremony, Calippus broke his vow and planned to kill Dion on the day celebrating the goddess Persephone.

On that date, Dion was celebrating at home with his friends. The assassins were Zacynthians, who wore light garments and who were unarmed. They walked into the house while other accomplices began shutting all doors and windows. The mercenaries attacked Dion choking him and then with a short Spartan sword he was stabbed to death.

Following Dion's assassination, Calippus seized power himself and ruled as tyrant of Syracuse for about a year before Syracuse successfully revolted against his rule and he was exiled from the city.

== In popular culture ==
Dion appears as a central character in Mary Renault's historical novel about classical Syracuse The Mask of Apollo (1966).

== See also ==
- Dionysius I of Syracuse
- Dionysius II of Syracuse
- Apollocrates
- Philistus
- Syracuse
- Calippus of Syracuse
- Plato
- Speusippus

== Notes ==
Preceded by: Dionysius the Younger	Tyrant of Syracuse; Intermittently from 357 –354 BC	Succeeded by: Calippus
