= Dionysius I of Syracuse =

Greek tyrant of Syracuse (c. 432 – 367 BC)

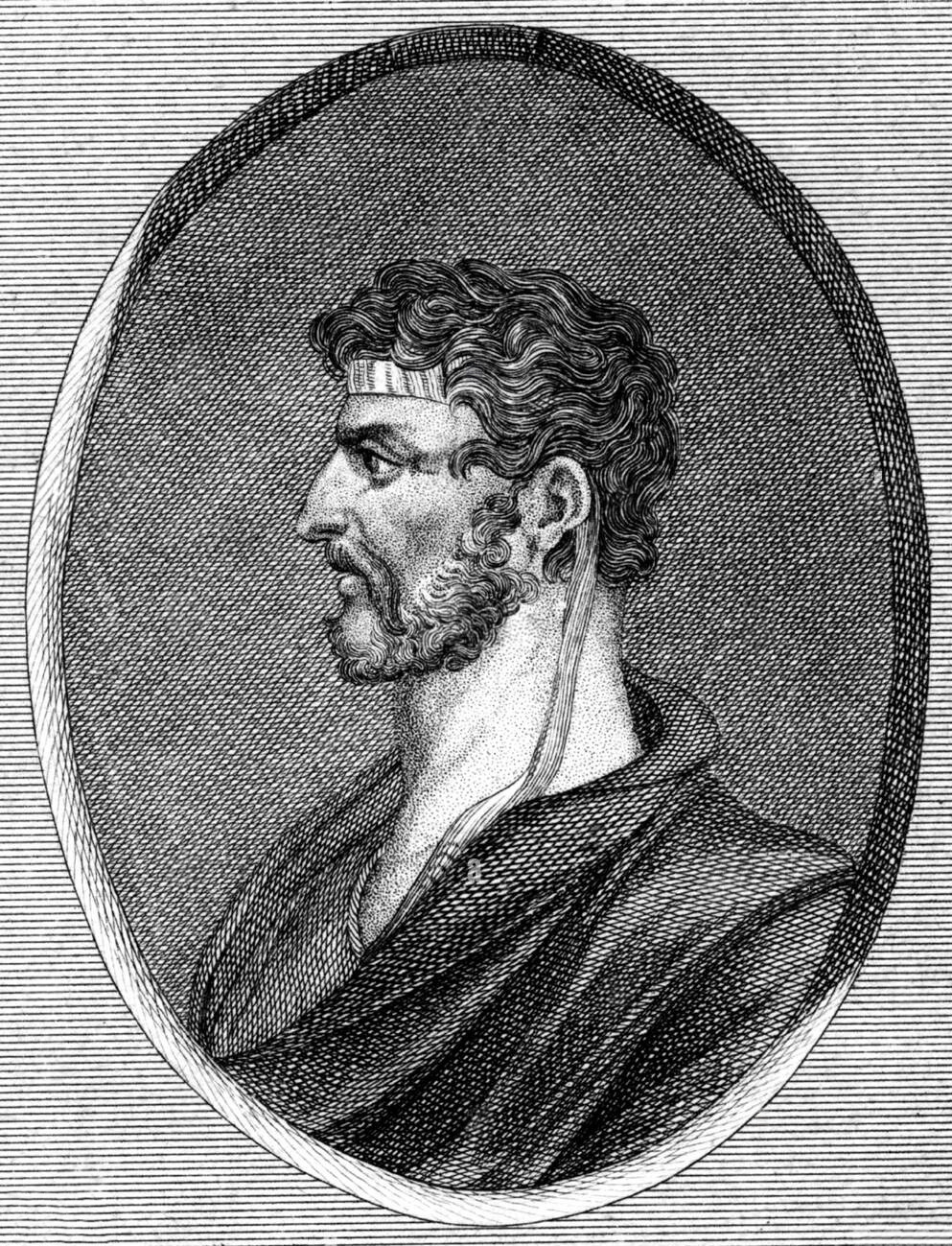
Portrait from Chronologisch geordneter Bildniss-Saal (1833) by Mark Karl Baldamus

Dionysius I or Dionysius the Elder (c. 432 – 367 BC) was a Greek tyrant of Syracuse, Sicily. He conquered several cities on Sicily and southern Italy, opposed Carthage's influence on Sicily and made Syracuse the most powerful of the western Greek colonies. He was regarded by the ancients as the worst kind of despot: cruel, suspicious, and vindictive.

== Early life ==
Dionysius was the son of Hermocrates, a prominent Syracusan general. Dionysius began his working life as a clerk in public office in Syracuse. Because of his achievements in the war against Carthage that began in 409 BC, he was elected supreme military commander in 406 BC. In the following year he seized total power and became tyrant. He was married to Aristomache, and had a daughter by her, Arete. He was married at the same time to Doris of Locris, who bore him his son, Dionysius II of Syracuse.

== Rise to power ==
Dionysius seized power with the help of a personal group of mercenaries, likely recruited from among the Sileraioi. This force, initially 600 men and later raised to 1,000, was granted to him as a bodyguard after he faked an attack on his own life. Having consolidated his position, Dionysius imposed the mercenaries on all parts of the polis community, signaling that democracy had ended in Syracuse. His rule was "unconstitutional and illegitimate and could not fail to provoke rebellions among the partisans of democratic government". Dionysius' position at home was threatened as early as 403 by those philosophically opposed to tyranny. Sparta, which had in the past deposed tyrants from Corinth to Athens, did not damn Dionysius and his autocracy. In fact, according to the historian Diodorus Siculus, relations between the two were very positive:

When the Lacedaemonians [Spartans] had settled the affairs of Greece to their own taste, they dispatched Aristus, one of their distinguished men, to Syracuse, ostensibly pretending that they would overthrow the government, but in truth with intent to increase the power of the tyranny; for they hoped that by helping to establish the rule of Dionysius they would obtain his ready service because of their benefactions to him.

Dionysius even received the privilege of conscripting mercenaries from lands under Spartan authority. The demise of such a prominent democratic polis and the subsequent actions of Dionysius represented a recurring norm in fourth-century Greek states, thanks to the prevalence of mercenaries. The mercenary and the tyrant went hand in hand; for example, Polybius noted that "the security of despots rests entirely on the loyalty and power of mercenaries". Aristotle wrote that some form of "guard" (i.e., a personal army) is needed for absolute kingship, and for an elected tyrant an optimum number of professional soldiers should be employed. Too few would undermine the tyrant's power, while too many would threaten the polis itself. The philosopher also notes that the people of Syracuse were warned not to let Dionysius conscript too many "guards" during his regime.

== Conquests ==
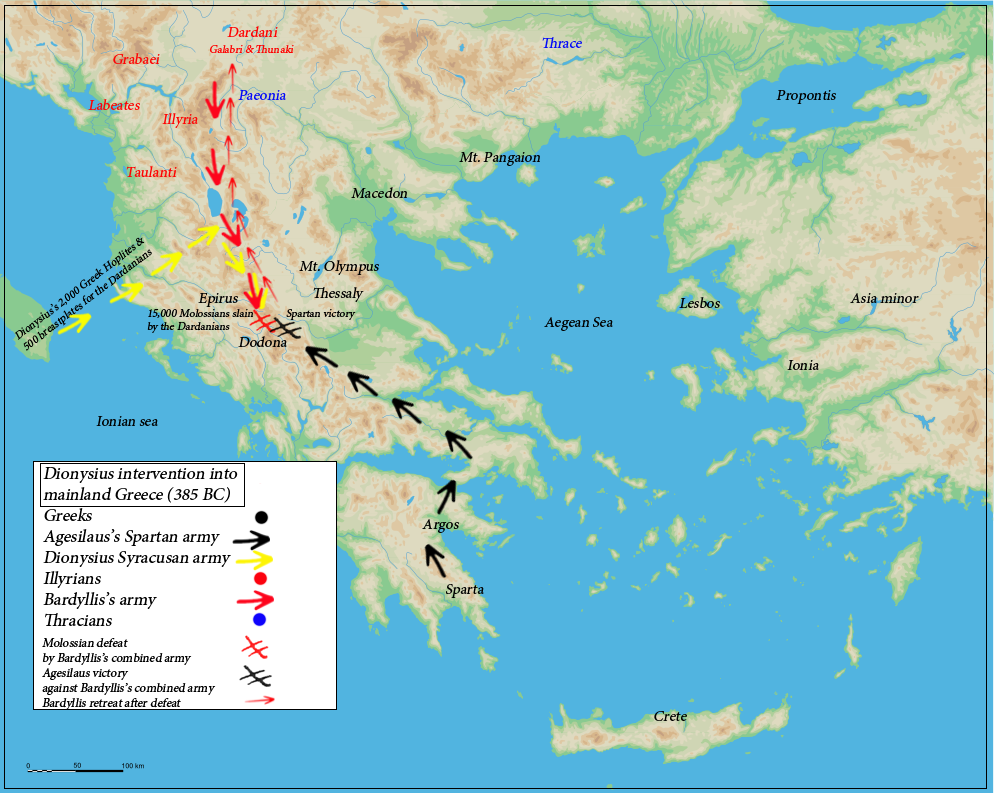
Dionysius of Syracuse's military attempts to place Alcetas in the throne of the Molossians

He fought a war with Carthage from 397 BC to 392 BC with mixed success; his attempts to drive the Carthaginians entirely out of Sicily failed; at his death they were still masters of at least a third of it.

He carried out an expedition against the Italiote League in 387 BC in southern Italy. In one campaign, in which he was joined by the Lucanians, he devastated the territories of Thurii and Croton in an attempt to defend Locri. After a protracted siege, he took Rhegium in 386 and sold the inhabitants as slaves.

He also pillaged the temple of Caere (then allied with Rome) on the Etruscan coast. In the Adriatic, to facilitate trade, Dionysius founded Ancona, Adria and Issa. After him, the Adriatic became a sea of Syracuse. In the Corinthian War, he joined the side of the Spartans and assisted them with mercenaries and ships (which contributed in blocking the Athenians' supplies from the Black Sea forcing them to peace).

In 385 BC, Alcetas of Epirus was a refugee in Dionysius' court. Dionysius wanted a friendly monarch in Epirus, so he sent 2,000 Greek hoplites and 500 suits of Greek armour to help the Illyrians under Bardyllis in attacking the Molossians of Epirus. They ravaged the region and killed 15,000 Molossians, and Alcetas regained his throne. He joined the Illyrians in an attempt to plunder the temple of Delphi. Sparta intervened under Agesilaus, however, and with aid from Thessaly, Macedonia, and the Molossians themselves, the Spartans expelled the Illyrians.

== Colonization of the Adriatic Sea (388 - 383 BC) ==
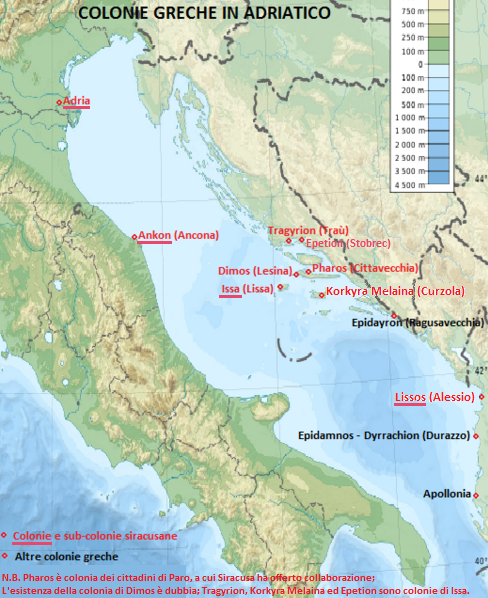
Syracusan colonies in the Adriatic (red label)

Around 387-385 BC, Dionysius undertook an intensive program of colonization of the Adriatic for a number of reasons: to dominate the naval routes to the rich grain markets of the Po Delta, to conquer Epirus and to gain access to the riches of the temples of Delphi. To do this, Dionysius made a pact with the Illyrians and the Senones.

in Italy Ankón (now Ancona, a colony populated in 387 BC by political exiles), and Adrìa (in 385 BC, now Adria); in Dalmatia Issa (now Vis) and in Albania Lissos (in 385 BC, now Lezhë).

In 385 Syracuse also collaborated with Paros in the foundation of Pharos (in 384 BC, now Stari Grad), on the island of Hvar in Croatia. The Syracusan colony of Issa in turn founded in 3rd century BC emporia in Tragyrion (now Trogir), Melaina Korkyra (now Korčula ) and Epetion (now Stobreč, a suburb of Split) and used the Greek emporium of Salona.

With this colonization program Dionysius effectively managed to secure total control over the Adriatic routes that carried Po Valley grain to Greece, thus allowing Syracuse and the whole of Sicily to compete with the Etruscans in this trade.

== Death ==
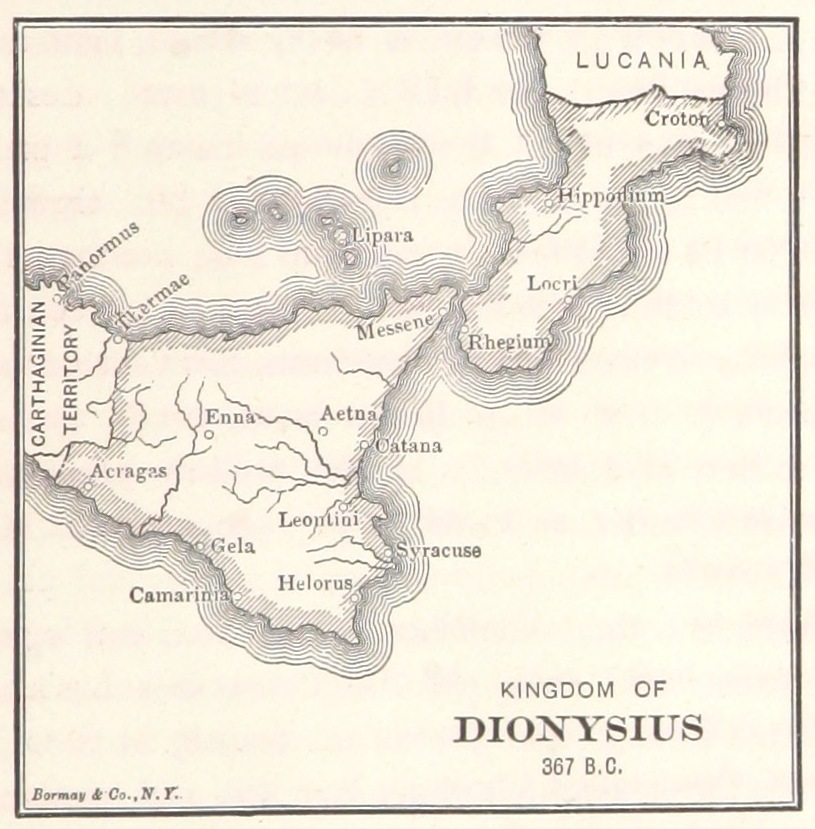
Kingdom of Dionysius, 367 BC

According to some sources, after gaining a prize for one of his tragedies, “The Ransom of Hector” (see Intellectual tastes below), at a competition at the Lenaia festival at Athens, he was so elated that he drank himself to death. Others such as Cicero and Diodorus Siculus report that he died of natural causes shortly after learning of his play's victory in 367 BC. According to others, he was given an overdose of a sleeping potion by his physicians at the instigation of his son, Dionysius the Younger, who succeeded him as ruler of Syracuse. A similar theory, proposed by Justin, stated that Dionysius "was defeated and broken by constant warfare, and finally murdered by a conspiracy of his own kin". Modern historian Jeff Champion states that there is no evidence to prove the claim he was conspired against.

His life was written by Philistus, but the work is lost.

== Intellectual tastes ==
Like Pisistratus, tyrant of Athens, Dionysius was fond of having literary men around him, such as the historian Philistus, the poet Philoxenus, and the philosopher Plato, but treated them in a most arbitrary manner. Diodorus Siculus relates in his Bibliotheca historica that Dionysius once had Philoxenus arrested and sent to the quarries for voicing a bad opinion about his poetry. The next day, he released Philoxenus because of his friends' requests, and brought the poet before him for another poetry reading. Dionysius read his own work and the audience applauded. When he asked Philoxenus how he liked it, the poet turned to the guards and said "take me back to the quarries." Plutarch relates a version of this story in his On the Fortune of Alexander.

He also posed as an author and patron of literature; his poems, severely criticized by Philoxenus, were hissed at the Olympic games, but having gained a prize for a tragedy on the Ransom of Hector at the Lenaea at Athens, he was so elated that he engaged in a debauch which, according to some sources, proved fatal. His name is also known for the legend of Damon and Pythias, and he features indirectly (via his son) in the legend of the Sword of Damocles. The Ear of Dionysius in Syracuse is an artificial limestone cave named after Dionysius.

== Historical significance and legacy ==
He was one of the first Greek rulers to be given divine honors during his lifetime, and he made innovations in military technique, such as siege engines, which became a standard feature of warfare under Alexander the Great and later generals.

It has been theorized that Brennus was working in concert with Dionysius, who sought to control all of Sicily. Rome had strong allegiances with Messana, a small city state in north east Sicily, which Dionysius wanted to control. Rome's army being pinned down by Brennus' efforts would have assisted Dionysius's campaign.

== See also ==
- Sicilian Wars
- Archimedes of Syracuse
- Pyrrhus of Epirus

== Notes ==
Preceded by: democracy position previously held by Thrasybulus in 465 BC	Tyrant of Syracuse; 405–367 BC	Succeeded by: Dionysius the Younger
