= Dionysius II of Syracuse =

4th-century BC Sicilian tyrant

Dionysius the Younger (Greek: Διονύσιος ὁ Νεώτερος, c. 397 BC – 343 BC), or Dionysius II, was a Greek politician who ruled Syracuse, Sicily from 367 BC to 357 BC and again from 346 BC to 344 BC.

== Biography ==
Dionysius II of Syracuse was the son of Dionysius the Elder and Doris of Locri. When his father died in 367 BC, Dionysius, who was at the time under thirty years old, and completely inexperienced in public affairs, inherited the supreme power and began ruling under the supervision of his uncle, Dion, whose disapproval of the young Dionysius's lavishly dissolute lifestyle compelled him to invite his teacher Plato to visit Syracuse. Together they attempted to restructure the government to be more moderate, with Dionysius as the archetypal philosopher-king (see the Seventh Letter of Plato).

However, under the influence of opponents of Dion's reforms, Dionysius conspired with the historian Philistus and banished his uncle, taking complete power in 366 BC. Without Dion, Dionysius's rule became increasingly unpopular, as he was mostly incompetent in governing men and commanding soldiers. When Plato appealed for Dion's return, the irritated Dionysius interfered with Dion's property and finances and gave his wife to another man. Before this, Dion's Syracusan estates had financed his peaceful and comfortable life overseas in Athens, but Dionysius's last offence spurred him into action.

Dion formed a small army at Zacynthus and returned to Sicily in 357 BC, much to the delight of the Syracusans. As Dionysius was in Caulonia, Italy at the time, Dion took all but Syracuse's island citadel easily. Dionysius sailed back to Syracuse immediately, attempted attacks from the citadel and tried to negotiate peace treaties. When he was unsuccessful in all attempts, he sailed to Locri and left the citadel in the hands of his son Apollocrates.

While in exile, Dionysius took advantage of the friendly citizens of Locri and became the city's tyrant, treating the locals with great cruelty. He did not return to Syracuse until 346 BC, eight years after Dion's assassination by his officers. Soon after he left Locri, the locals drove out the remaining troops and took their revenge on Dionysius's wife and daughters. Dionysius, who was still unpopular, was able to regain power in Syracuse only because of its great political instability. In the preceding years many other cities in Sicily defected from Syracuse and were ruled by local tyrants. Several of these cities joined the Syracusans in an attack against Dionysius which proved to be quite successful. Dionysius was forced back into the citadel. At this time, 344 BC, Timoleon arrived and began his invasion of Sicily. Dionysius, out of respect for Timoleon and aware he no longer had a chance of victory, arranged the surrender of the citadel and was given safe passage to Corinth. Dionysius died in the following year in Corinth, where he lived in increasingly miserable conditions.

== In the doctrine of illumination ==
In the Seventh Letter Dionysius II is central to the detailed description of Plato's epistemological digression, known as doctrine of illumination in secondary literature. Following his second visit to Sicily, Plato received a letter from Archytas praising the progress Dionysius II had made in philosophy. Plato visits a third time and tests Dionysius II to determine whether he had really made as much progress in philosophy as reported. According to the Seventh Letter, the authenticity of a prospective philosopher could be tested by setting out the extent of the undertaking. Those possessing a divine quality would accept the challenge, while pseudo-philosophers would find the tasks so daunting they would abandon the pursuit of wisdom.

According to the doctrine of illumination, a genuine philosopher will regulate and order all daily activities to enhance learning and reason. Disclosing the true and difficult nature of philosophical life was an infallible test to separate the wheat from the chaff. Plato's view was that philosophers had to develop a resolute character while engaging in philosophical education. Those who shun hard work, needed to be rejected. When Plato disclosed the nature of philosophical pursuits and the self-discipline needed to gain insights into higher matters, Dionysius II claimed to already know the most significant aspects of Plato's teachings. In the Seventh Letter, Plato also suspects that Dionysius II had published a treatise expounding his knowledge of philosophy as teachings. By disdaining further training, Dionysius II fails Plato's test.

== In popular culture and literature ==
Often misattributed to Dionysius II, his father, Dionysius I, is one of the central characters in the legend of the Sword of Damocles. The anecdote apparently figured in the lost history of Sicily by Timaeus of Tauromenium (c. 356–260 BC). Cicero used it in his Tusculanae Disputationes, 5. 61,[1] by which means it passed into the European cultural mainstream.

Dionysius II has been argued by some as the "Dionysius of Sicily" referenced in Canto 12 of Dante's Inferno. This Dionysius is among the many souls named by Chiron that boil in blood for tyranny. However, his father, Dionysius I, is largely considered the true subject.

The Renaissance alchemist Michael Maier relates a legend about Dionysius II in his book Atalanta Fugiens (1617), where he was shipwrecked at the Gulf of Corinth, and without his swimming skills he could have never reached the shore. At Corinth, although he lived poorly, he became a teacher. Maier uses this legend as an allegory to explain a certain point in the Magnum opus, when the "philosophical subject" (the stone) must ascend to the surface of the "philosophical water".

Dionysius also features in Mary Renault's The Mask of Apollo.

== Notes ==
Preceded by: Dionysius the Elder	Tyrant of Syracuse; 367 BC – 356 BC	Succeeded by: Dion
Preceded by: –	Tyrant of Locri; 356 BC – 346 BC	Succeeded by: –
Preceded by: Nysaeos	Tyrant of Syracuse; 347 BC – 344 BC	Succeeded by: Timoleon
