= Homosexuality in ancient Greece =

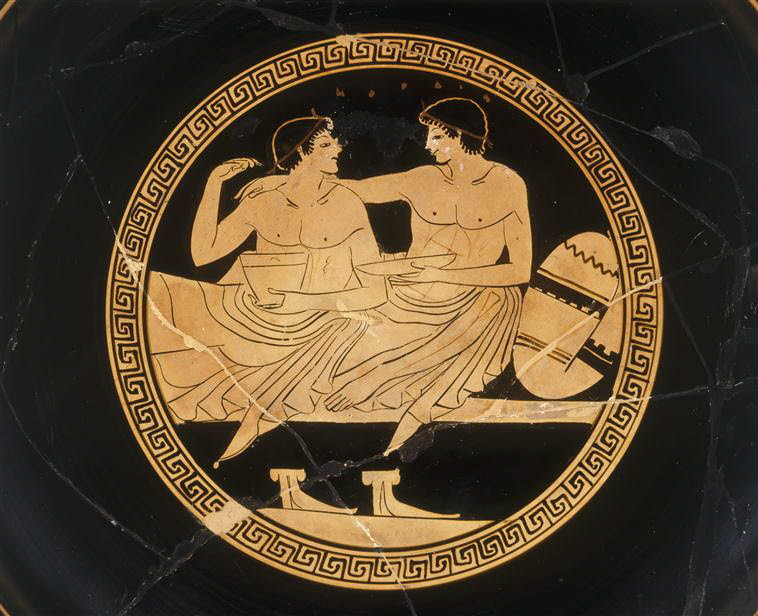
This image has been given the description of a "...courting couple at the symposium." and a "Symposium scene with youths." Interior of an Attic cup. Artist; Painter from Colmar. Around 500 - 450 BCE. Louvre Museum

In classical antiquity, writers such as Herodotus, Plato, Xenophon, Athenaeus, and many others explored aspects of homosexuality in Greek society. This often took the form of pederasty, usually seen among some elite circles, involving an adult man and an adolescent boy (marriages in Ancient Greece between men and women were also age-structured, with men in their thirties commonly taking wives in their early teens). Certain city-states allowed it while others were ambiguous or prohibited it. Sexual relationships between adult men did exist, though it is possible at least one member of each of these relationships flouted social conventions by assuming a passive sexual role. It is unclear how such relations between same-sex partners were regarded in the general society, especially for women, but examples do exist as far back as the time of Sappho.

== Pederasty ==
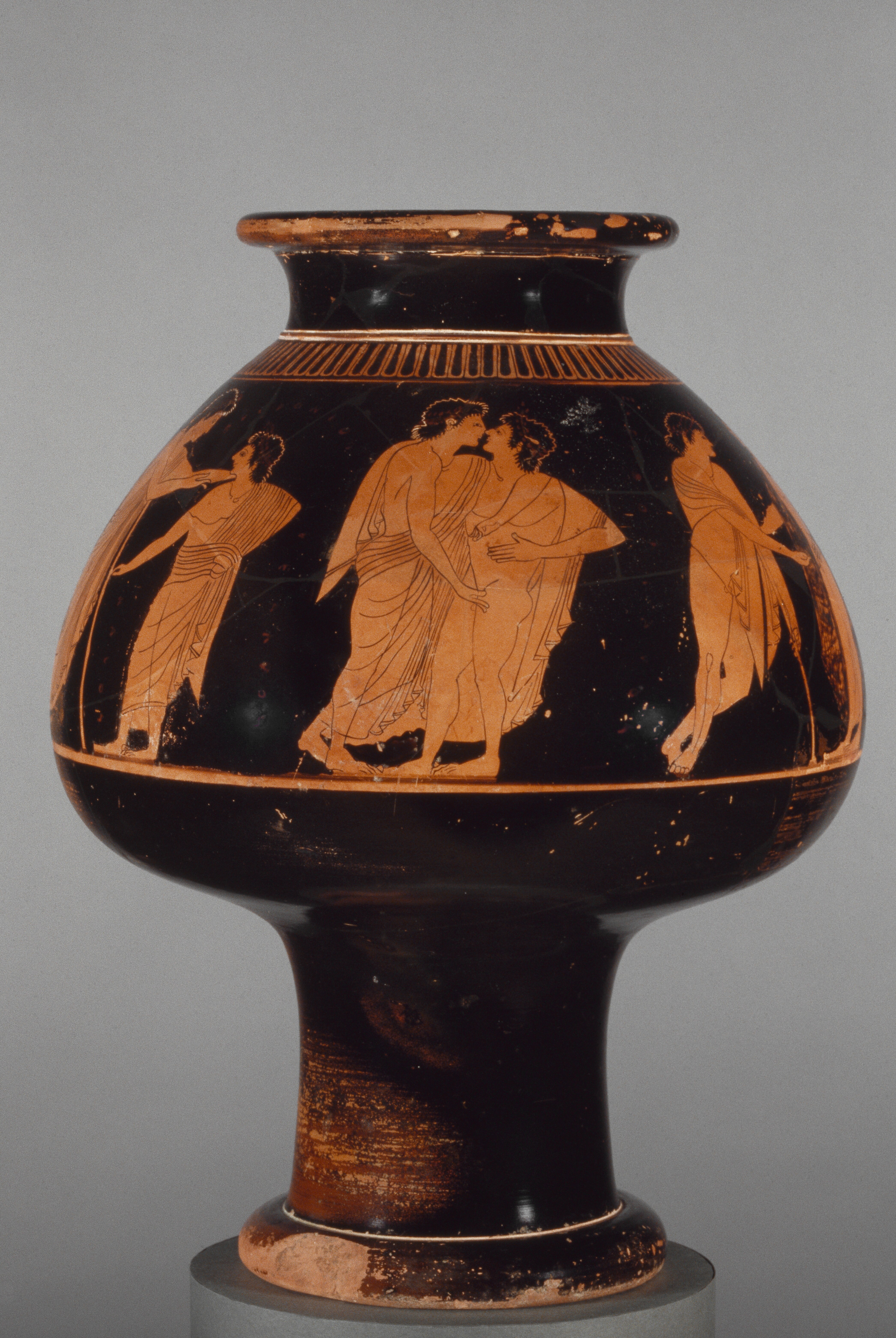
Pederastic scene between two males. Attic Psykter. Terracotta. Attributed to Smikros. Around 510 BCE

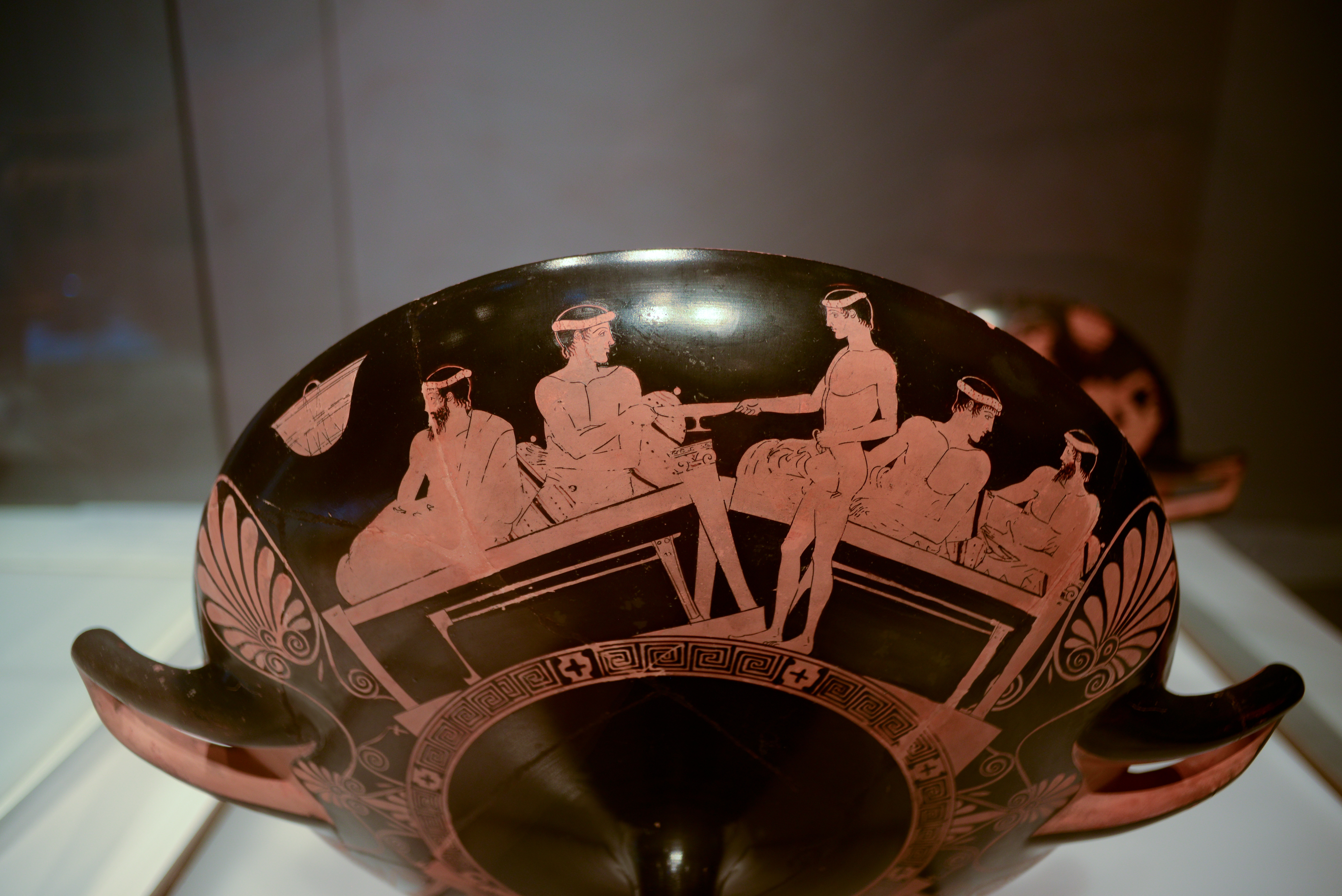
Symposium scene. Attic kylix. Around 460-450 BCE

The most common form of same-sex relationships between elite males in Greece was paiderastia (pederasty). It was a relationship between an older male and an adolescent youth. A boy was considered a "boy" until he was able to grow a full beard. The older man was called erastes. He was to educate, protect, love, and provide a role model for his eromenos, whose reward for him lay in his beauty, youth, and promise. Such a concept is backed up by archaeological evidence experts have found throughout the years, such as a bronze plaque of an older man carrying a bow and arrow while grabbing a younger man by the arms, who is carrying a goat. Furthermore, the boy's genitals are exposed in the plaque; thus, experts interpret this, and more evidence comparable to this, as the practice of pederasty. Scholar Keith DeVries notes that some painted vases may depict the eromenoi flirting instead of deflecting advances from their erastes. He states that wrist-grabbing only leaves the genitals open for the suitor, which could mean an invitation.

Scholars have debated the role or extent to which ancient Greeks engaged in and tolerated pederasty, which is likely to have varied according to local custom and individual inclination. It has no formal existence in the Homeric epics, and may have developed in the late 7th century BC as an aspect of Greek homosocial culture.

Pederasty was both idealized and criticized in ancient literature and philosophy. The argument has recently been made that pederasty was idealized in the Archaic period; criticism began in Athens as part of the general Classical Athenian reassessment of Archaic culture.

Some scholars locate its origin in initiation ritual, particularly rites of passage on Crete, where it was associated with entrance into military life and the religion of Zeus. Cretan pederasty as a social institution seems to have been grounded in an initiation which involved abduction. The man took the boy into the wilderness, where they spent two months hunting and feasting with their friends. The youth then lived in a type of public intimacy with his lover. This older man would educate the youth in the ways of Greek life and the responsibilities of adulthood. The practice spread from Crete to other regions. Penetrative sex, however, was seen as demeaning for the passive partner, and outside the socially accepted norm.

The erastes shows restraint in his “pursuit” rather than his “capture” of the young boy, and the eromenos would similarly show restraint by not immediately giving in to the older man’s sexual desires. Soon after, the younger man gives in to his new mentor—erastes—and receives guidance from him. Nevertheless, it is not certain that those in submission will enjoy such "trainings" from his mentor—including sexual favors. However, not all pederastic relationships were sexual—many were simply forms of friendship and guidance.

== In the military ==
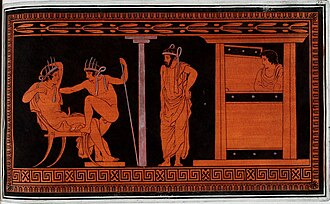
Sex between youths by the Dinos Painter, fifth century BCE.

The Spartan government used an institutionalized training system called the agoge to raise all male youth once they turned 7 years old. Each group was prepared for citizenship by receiving an education that was deemed for "practical purposes" including reading, writing, and musical arts. Military training started around the age of 12 as well as communal living. In Xenophon's' pamphlet on Spartan politeia (Lak. Pol.) he states that "the aim of this education is to produce men who are obedient, respectful, and self-controlled which makes these Spartan men better quality than Greeks." Training groups were broken up by age: 8-11, 12-15,16-20, and graduated at the age of 30. Each unit was directed by a senior who was at least 20 years old.

Males from the age of 20 to 30 were not allowed to live with their wives and even after 30 still had to eat the main meal of the day in the syssitia. During this time, pederasty was encouraged and thought to be an essential part of socialization and camaraderie for the youth. Xenophon made a statement that, "Lykourgos deemed if an honorable and respectable man was enamoured with the character of a boy should try to befriend him and spend time with him." There is also a claim of "lust being shameful," with there to be no sex between them. Xenophon also made note that some states tolerate sensual gratification with boys, for chastity would be hard. Aristotle also claims that homosexuality was discouraged in Sparta (although he could be referring to adult homosexual relationships and not pederasty). Aelian, Plutarch and Maximus of Tyre follow Xenophon's general line on Spartan pederastic chastity.

Erich Bethe hypothesized that from the 5th- 7th centuries pederasty was institutionalized and started as a form of initiation. He believed it was considered a "rite de passage" in order for the initiate to graduate and be considered an adult warrior. He believed the passing of semen from the erastes to the eromenos was fundamental in the passing of military excellence on to the younger members.

The Sacred Band of Thebes was made up of male lovers who fought together. It was said that their emotional bond made them continuously victorious, believing that they would "fight all the more bravely" with their lovers by their sides. Spartans did not put pairs together in war; these were intended more for a mentorship and training purpose, not for motivation during war. A 2002 article by Leitao, citing Xenophon's failure to mention it in his work the Hellenica—a political and military history of the first part of the 4th century—argues that "the historicity of an erotic Sacred Band rests on the most precarious of foundations" (p. 143). The Thebans attributed to the Sacred Band the power of Thebes for the generation before its fall to Philip II of Macedon, who, when he surveyed the dead after the Battle of Chaeronea and saw the bodies of the Sacred Band strewn on the battlefield, delivered this harsh criticism of the Spartan views of the band:

Perish miserably they who think that these men did or suffered aught disgraceful.

Pammenes' opinion, according to Plutarch, was that

Homer's Nestor was not well skilled in ordering an army when he advised the Greeks to rank tribe and tribe...he should have joined lovers and their beloved. For men of the same tribe little value one another when dangers press; but a band cemented by friendship grounded upon love is never to be broken.

These bonds, reflected in episodes from Greek mythology, such as the heroic relationship between Achilles and Patroclus in the Iliad, were thought to boost morale as well as bravery due to the desire to impress and protect their lover. Such relationships were documented by many Greek historians and in philosophical discourses, as Plutarch demonstrates:

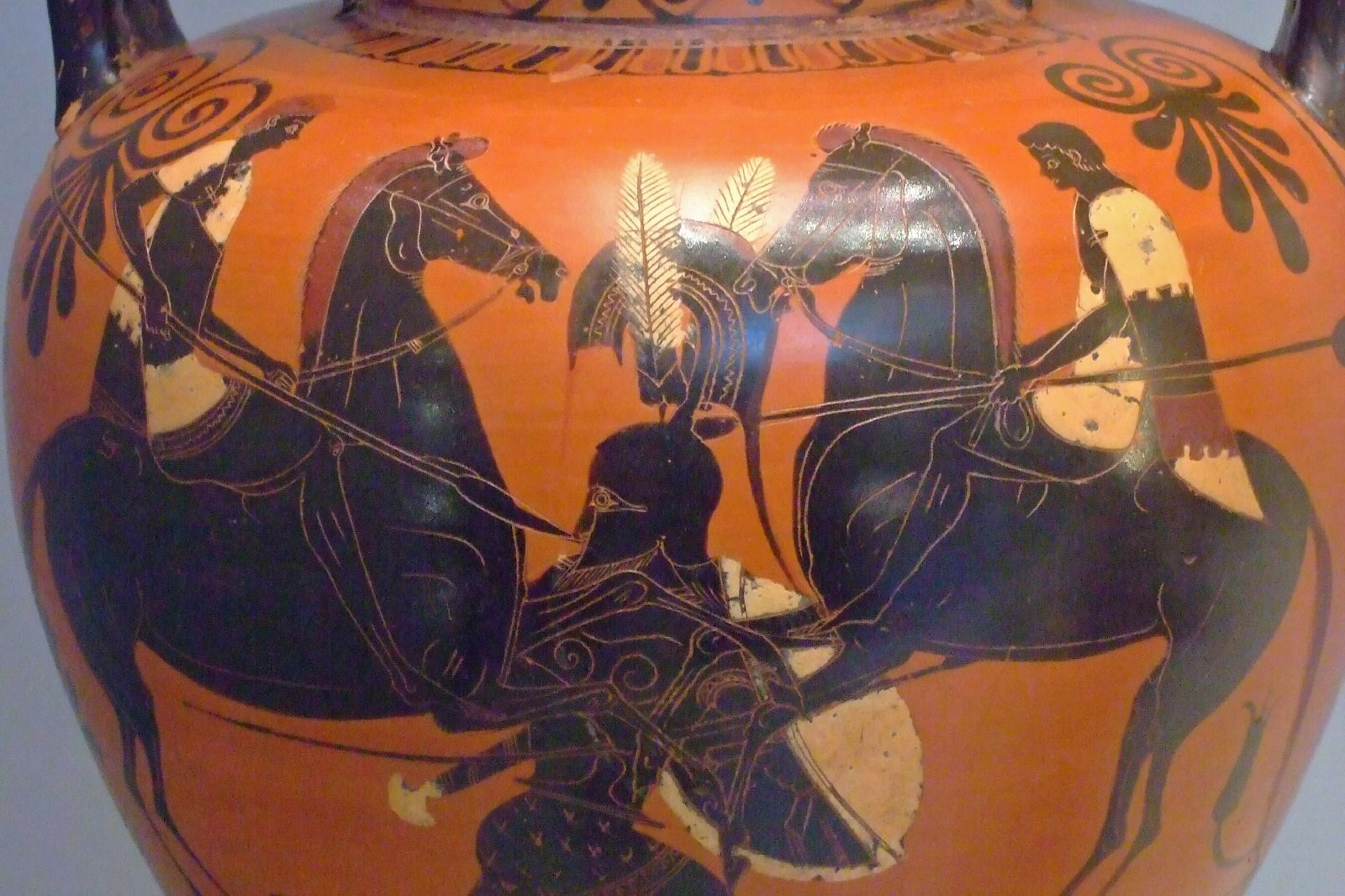
Black figured amphora depicting cavalrymen. Credit: mharrsch. CC BY 2.0/flickr

It is not only the most warlike peoples, the Boeotians, Spartans, and Cretans, who are the most susceptible to this kind of love but also the greatest heroes of old: Meleager, Achilles, Aristomenes, Cimon, and Epaminondas. During the Lelantine War between the Eretrians and the Chalcidians, before a decisive battle the Chalcidians called for the aid of a Thessalian warrior named Kleomachos of Pharsalos. He answered their request, bringing his lover to watch. Leading the charge against the Eretrians he brought the Chalcidians to victory at the cost of his own life. The Chalcidians erected a tomb for him in the marketplace in gratitude.

== Spartan weddings ==
After 500 BC, Spartan men were required to get married. It was considered a public service to have children. For a Spartan wedding, the bride's hair was cropped short to show she was now a woman, and the men grew their hair long. This reversal continued for the bride, who was dressed in men's attire and wearing a fake beard. This was explained as apotropaic cross-dressing. George Devereux, on the other hand, suggested this was to make the husband's transition from homosexual to heterosexual relationships easier, thereby marking pederasty relationships as temporary, developmental ones, and not ones of sexual and intimate connection like with a woman. However, if the male was under the age of 30, he had to sneak over at night to see his bride and was not allowed to live with her. In some cases, they kept the marriage a secret until there was a child. Once the male was deemed to have enough children, he could then honorably pass his wife on to a friend. It is also noted as 'ancestral custom' for a wife to have three or more husbands, depending on whether they were related and any children born belonged to all husbands. Yet, when two men of similar age shared a similar relationship, it was deemed taboo and, in fact, perverse.

== Sex between adult men ==
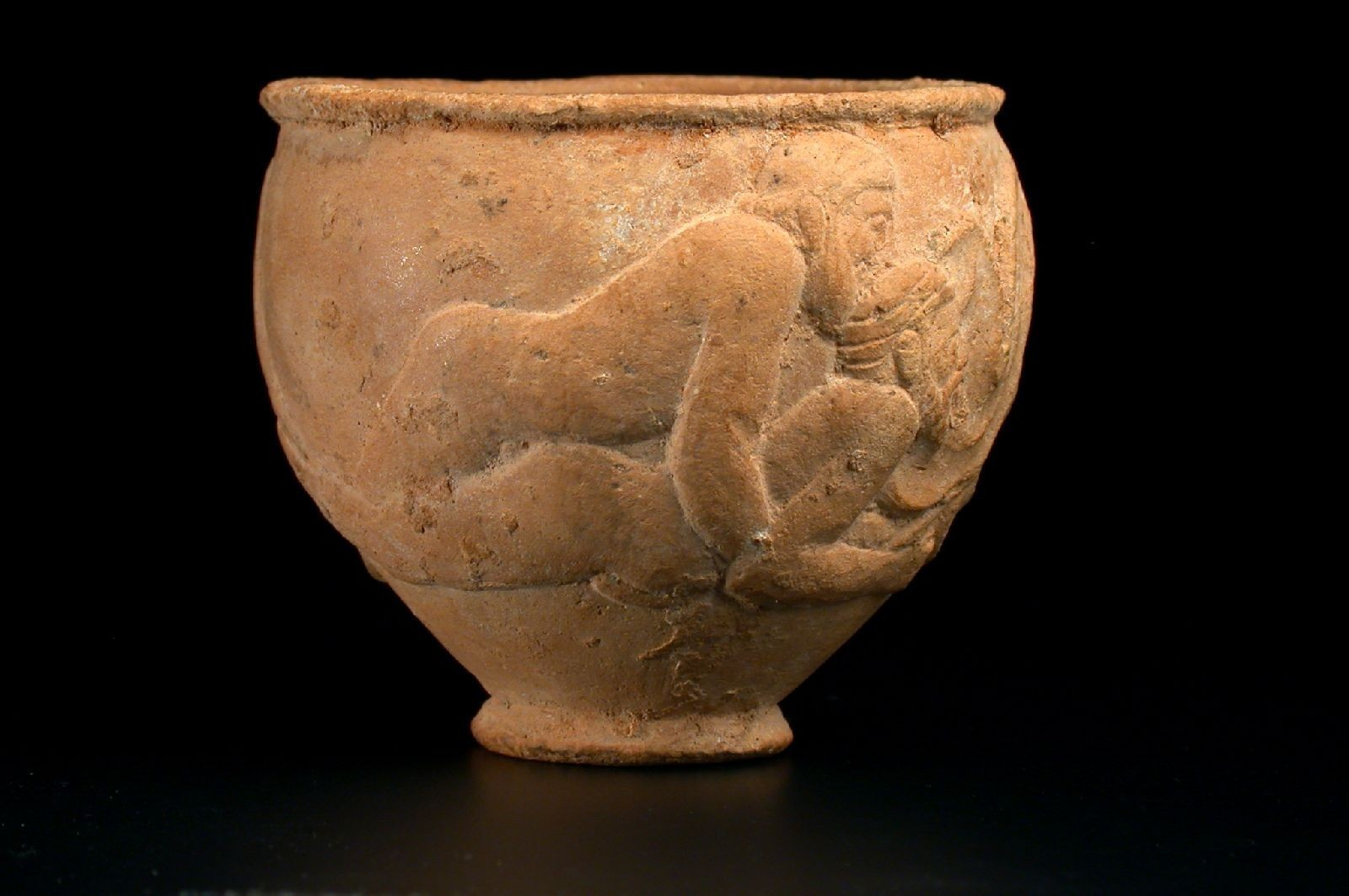
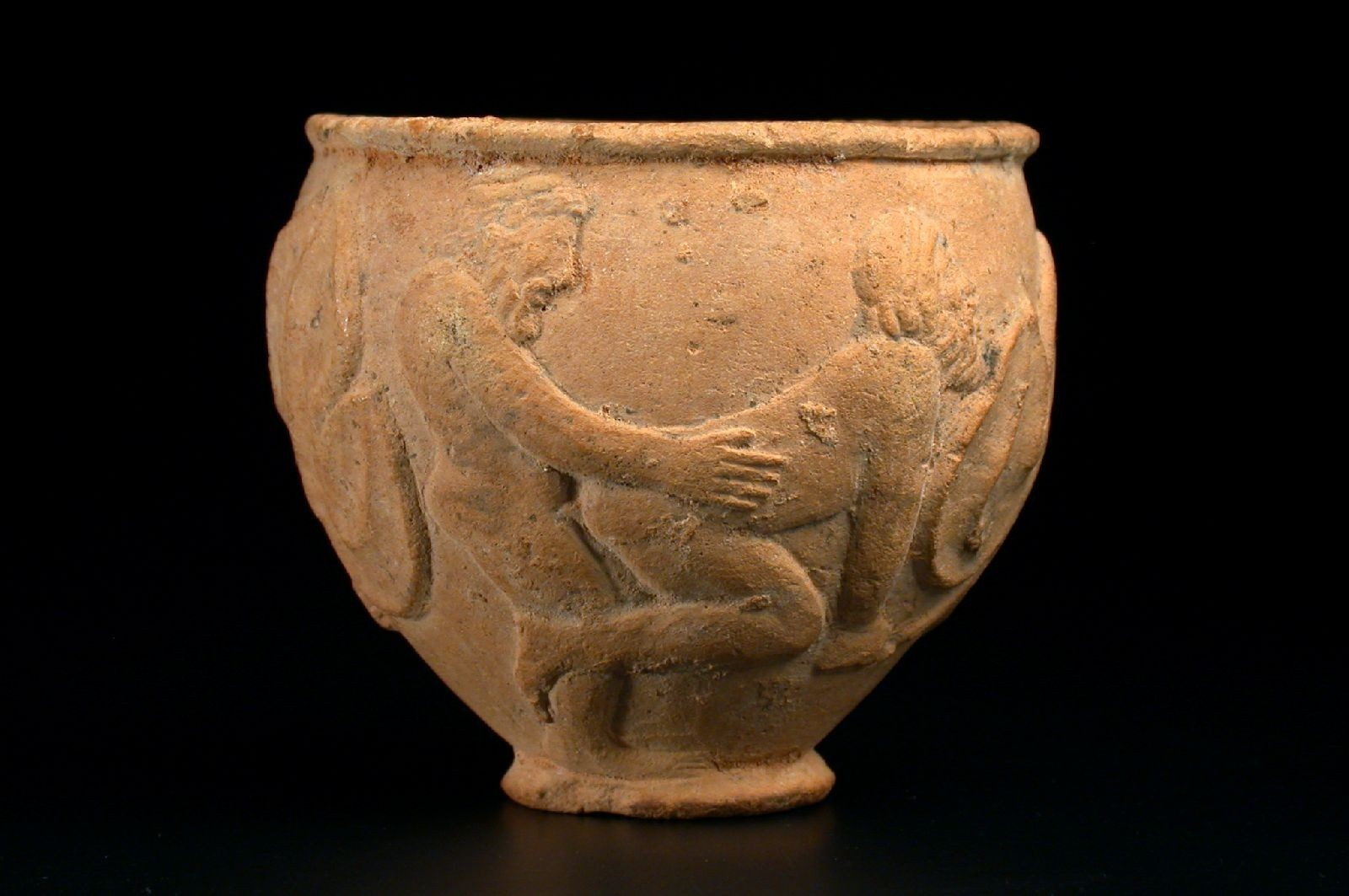
Anal sex between two males. Two sides of a drinking cup. Greek; archaic period. 550-500 BCE

According to the opinion of the classicist Kenneth Dover who published Greek Homosexuality in 1978, given the importance in Greek society of cultivating the masculinity of the adult male and the perceived feminizing effect of being the passive partner, relations between adult men of comparable social status were considered highly problematic, and usually associated with social stigma. This stigma, however, was reserved for only the passive partner in the relationship. According to Dover and his supporters, Greek males who engaged in passive anal sex after reaching the age of manhood—at which point they were expected to take the reverse role in pederastic relationships and become the active and dominant member—thereby were feminized or "made a woman" of themselves. Dover refers to insults used in the plays of Aristophanes as evidence that "passive" men were ridiculed.

More recent work published by T. K. Hubbard have challenged this model, arguing that it is reductionist and have provided evidence to the contrary.

The legislator Philolaus of Corinth, lover of the stadion race winner Diocles of Corinth at the Ancient Olympic Games of 728 BC, crafted laws for the Thebans in the 8th century BC that gave special support to male unions, contributing to the development of Theban pederasty in which, unlike other places in ancient Greece, it favored the continuity of the union of male couples even after the younger man reached adulthood, the most famous example being the Sacred Band of Thebes, composed of elite soldiers in pairs of male lovers in the 4th century BC, as was also the case with him and Diocles, who lived together in Thebes until the end of their lives.

The romance between Pausanias and Agathon in Athens, made famous by their appearance in Plato's Symposium, also continued from the pederastic phase into adulthood as a stable and long-lasting relationship.

=== Achilles and Patroclus ===
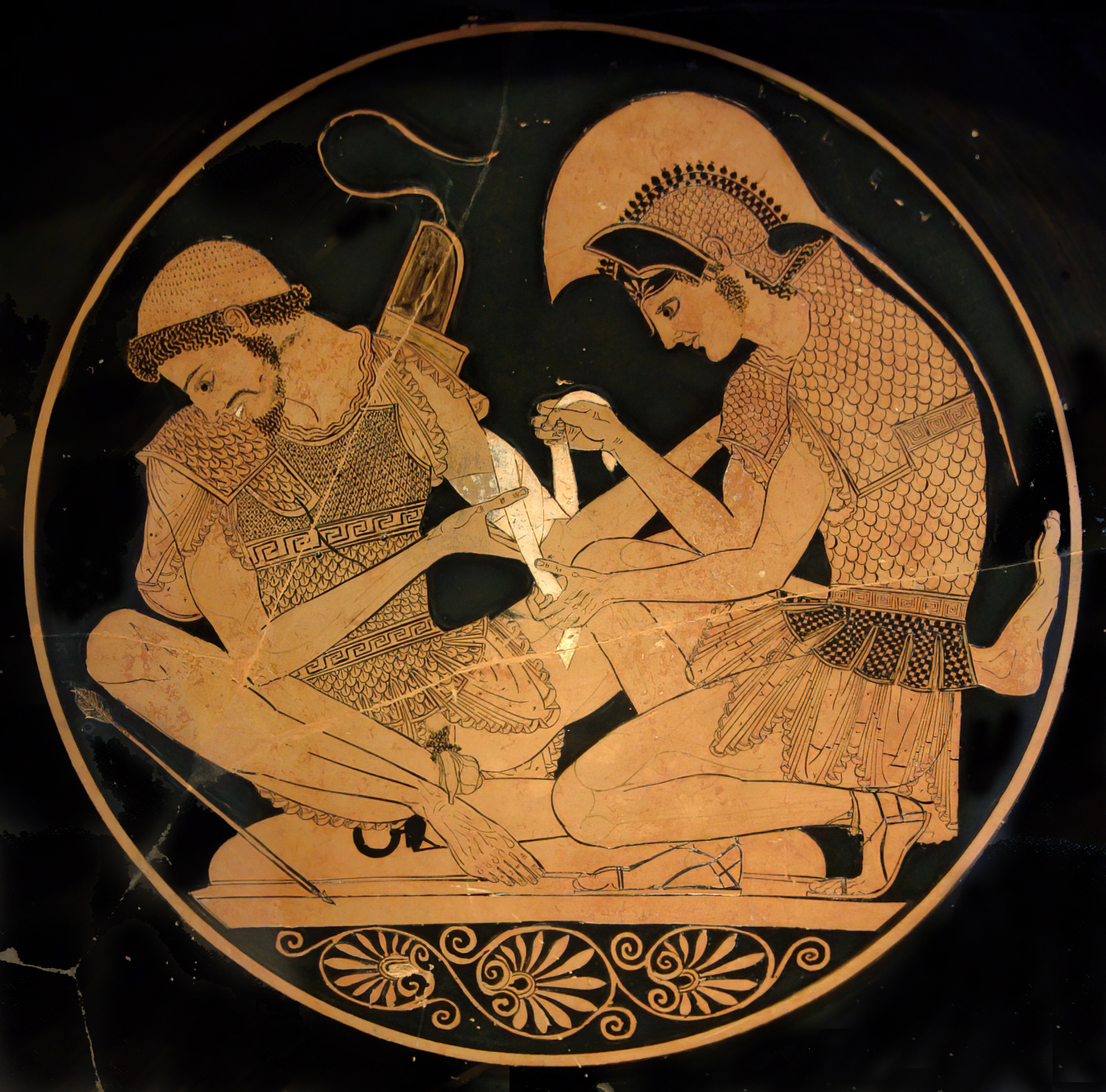
Achilles and Patroclus

The first recorded appearance of a deep emotional bond between adult men in ancient Greek culture was in the Iliad (800 BC). In the original epic, Homer does not depict the relationship between Achilles and Patroclus as sexual. However, they were depicted as such by some writers in the later Classical Greek period. The ancient Athenians emphasised the supposed age difference between the two by portraying Patroclus with a beard in paintings and pottery, while Achilles is clean-shaven, although Achilles was an almost godlike figure in Greek society. This led to a disagreement about which to perceive as erastes and which as eromenos among elites such as Aeschylus and Pausanias, since Homeric tradition made Patroclus out to be older but Achilles stronger. It has been noted, however, that the depictions of characters on pottery do not represent reality and may cater to the beauty standards of ancient Athens. Other ancients such as Socrates argued in Xenophon's Symposium that Achilles and Patroclus were simply close friends.

Aeschylus in the tragedy Myrmidons made Achilles the erastes since he had avenged his lover's death even though the gods told him it would cost his own life. However, the character of Phaedrus in Plato's Symposium asserts that Homer emphasized the beauty of Achilles, which would qualify him, not Patroclus, as eromenos.

=== Theseus and Pirithous ===
Theseus and Pirithous are another famous pair of close adult male best friends of the same age whose strong bond has homoerotic connotations according to some ancient authors.

Pirithous had heard stories of Theseus's courage and strength in battle but wanted proof, so he rustled Theseus's herd of cattle and drove it from Marathon and Theseus set out in pursuit. Pirithous took up his arms, and the pair met to do battle but were so impressed with each other's gracefulness, beauty and courage they took an oath of friendship.

According to Ovid, Phaedra, Theseus' wife, felt left out by her husband's love for Pirithous, and she used this as an excuse to try to convince her stepson, Hippolytus, to accept being her lover, as Theseus also neglected his son because he preferred to spend long periods with his companion.

=== Orestes and Pylades ===
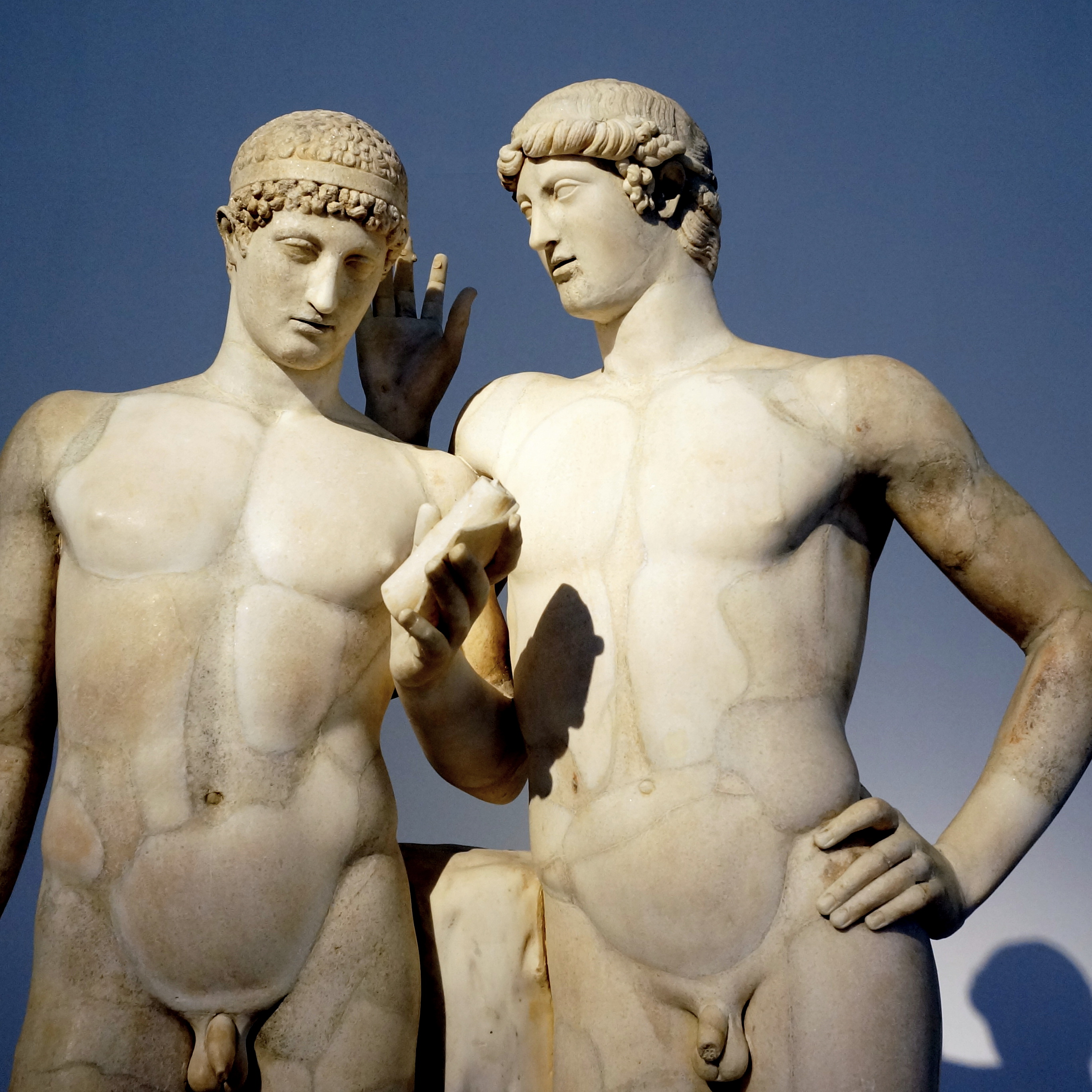
Orestes and Pylades, attributed to Pasiteles school

Orestes and Pylades, similarly to Achilles and Patroclus, grew up together from childhood to adulthood. Their relationship is stronger and more intimate than any of their relationships with other people.

The relationship between them has been interpreted by some authors from Roman times onwards as romantic or homoerotic. The dialogue Erotes ("Affairs of the Heart"), attributed to Lucian, compares the merits and advantages of heteroeroticism and homoeroticism, and Orestes and Pylades are presented as the principal representatives of a loving friendship.

In 1734, George Frederic Handel's opera Oreste (based on Giangualberto Barlocci's Roman libretto of 1723), was premiered in London's Covent Garden. The fame of Lucian's works in the 18th century, as well as the generally well-known tradition of Greco-Roman heroic homoeroticism, made it natural for theatre audiences of that period to have recognized an intense, romantic, if not positively homoerotic quality, in the relationship between Orestes and Pylades.

=== Alexander and Hephaestion ===
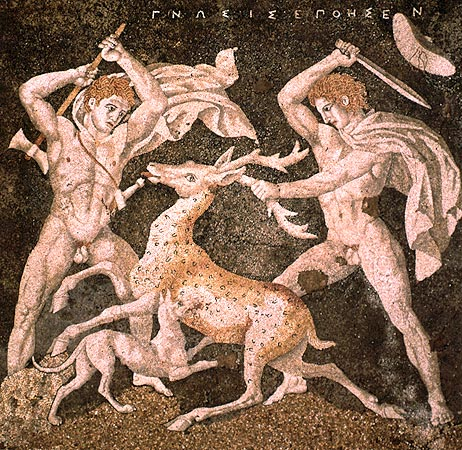
The emblema of the Stag Hunt Mosaic, c. 300 BC, from Pella; the figure on the right is possibly Alexander the Great due to the date of the mosaic, along with the depicted upsweep of his centrally-parted hair (anastole); the figure on the left wielding a double-edged axe (associated with Hephaistos) is perhaps Hephaestion.

Alexander the Great had a close emotional attachment to his cavalry commander (hipparchus) and childhood friend, Hephaestion. He was "by far the dearest of all the king's friends; he had been brought up with Alexander and shared all his secrets." This relationship lasted throughout their lives, and was compared, by others as well as themselves, to that of Achilles and Patroclus.

Hephaestion studied with Alexander, as did a handful of other children of Ancient Macedonian aristocracy, under the tutelage of Aristotle. Hephaestion makes his appearance in history at the point when Alexander reaches Troy. There they made sacrifices at the shrines of the two heroes Achilles and Patroclus; Alexander honoring Achilles, and Hephaestion honoring Patroclus.

Ancient writers did not conclusively identify them as lovers. However, many modern scholars believe that it is possible they could have been lovers. According to Robin Lane Fox, Alexander and Hephaestion were possible lovers. After Hephaestion's death in Oct 324 BC, Alexander mourned him greatly and did not eat for days. Alexander held an elaborate funeral for Hephaestion at Babylon, and sent a note to the shrine of Ammon, which had previously acknowledged Alexander as a god, asking them to grant Hephaestion divine honours. The priests declined, but did offer him the status of divine hero. Alexander died soon after receiving this letter; Mary Renault suggests that his grief over Hephaestion's death had led him to be careless with his health.

Alexander was overwhelmed by his grief for Hephaestion, so much that Arrian records that Alexander "flung himself on the body of his friend and lay there nearly all day long in tears, and refused to be parted from him until he was dragged away by force by his Companions".

=== Harmodius and Aristogeiton ===
Harmodius and Aristogeiton were two lovers in Classical Athens who became known as the Tyrannicides (τυραννόκτονοι, tyrannoktonoi) for their assassination of Hipparchus, the brother of the tyrant Hippias, for which they were executed. A few years later, in 510 BC, the Spartan king Cleomenes I forced Hippias to go into exile, thereby opening the way to the subsequent democratic reforms of Cleisthenes. The Athenian democrats later celebrated Harmodius and Aristogeiton as national heroes, partially to conceal the role played by Sparta in the removal of the Athenian tyranny. Cleisthenes notably commissioned the famous statues of the Tyrannicides.

The two principal historical sources covering Harmodius and Aristogeiton are the History of the Peloponnesian War (VI, 56–59) by Thucydides, and The Constitution of the Athenians (XVIII) attributed to Aristotle or his school. However, their story is documented by several other ancient writers, including important sources such as Herodotus and Plutarch.

== Sex between adult women ==
Generally, the lives of ancient Greek women were not well-documented. The historical record of love and sexual relations between women is sparse.

There is some speculation that pederastic-style relationships existed between women and adolescent girls, especially in Sparta, together with athletic nudity for women. In the 700s BC, the Spartan poet Alcman used the term aitis, as the feminine form of aites — which was the official term for the younger participant in a pederastic relationship.

During the year 610 B.C., a group of teenage girls was documented singing classic hymns during ploughing rituals. Such songs involved likely flirtation, with lyrics like "If only Astaphis were mine, if only Philulla were to look in my direction" and ". . . but I mustn't go on, for Hagesichora has got her eye on me."

Thy soul
Grown delicate with satieties,
Atthis.
O Atthis,
I long for thy lips.

I long for thy narrow breasts,
Thou restless, ungathered.

— Ezra Pound, "ἰμέρρω": adaptation of Sappho 96

=== Sappho of Lesbos ===
The lyric poet Sappho was born on the Greek island of Lesbos sometime between 630 and 612 BCE. She wrote many wedding songs and love poems addressed to women, and became so well-known that she lent the name of her island, "lesbian", to eventually mean "love between women".

The Library of Alexandria collected Sappho's work into nine volumes, much of which was lost in the fire. Only about 600 lines of Sappho's estimated 12,000 lines of poetry have survived.

=== Reference in The Symposium ===
In the 300s BCE, Aristophanes, in Plato's Symposium, recounts a story accounting for the origin of human love. Before being split in half by the gods, humans were originally created with four legs, four arms, and two faces. Since we were split, each human is always seeking our other half to become complete. He says that there were originally four-legged male people (who became men attracted only to men), four-legged hermaphroditic people (who became heterosexuals), and four-legged female people (who are women attracted to women). (Note: "[H]e begins by treating of the origin of human nature. The sexes were originally three, men, women, and the union of the two; and they were made round—having four hands, four feet, two faces on a round neck, and the rest to correspond. Terrible was their strength and swiftness; and they were essaying to scale heaven and attack the gods. Doubt reigned in the celestial councils; the gods were divided between the desire of quelling the pride of man and the fear of losing the sacrifices. At last Zeus hit upon an expedient. Let us cut them in two, he said; then they will only have half their strength, and we shall have twice as many sacrifices. He spake, and split them as you might split an egg with an hair; and when this was done, he told Apollo to give their faces a twist and re-arrange their persons, taking out the wrinkles and tying the skin in a knot about the navel. The two halves went about looking for one another, and were ready to die of hunger in one another's arms. Then Zeus invented an adjustment of the sexes, which enabled them to marry and go their way to the business of life. Now the characters of men differ accordingly as they are derived from the original man or the original woman, or the original man-woman. Those who come from the man-woman are lascivious and adulterous; those who come from the woman form female attachments; those who are a section of the male follow the male and embrace him, and in him all their desires centre.") The four-legged females become women who "do not care for men, but have female attachments". For these relationships between women, Aristophanes uses the term trepesthai (to be focused on) instead of eros, which was applied to other erotic relationships between men, and between men and women.

=== Characters in Lucian's Works ===
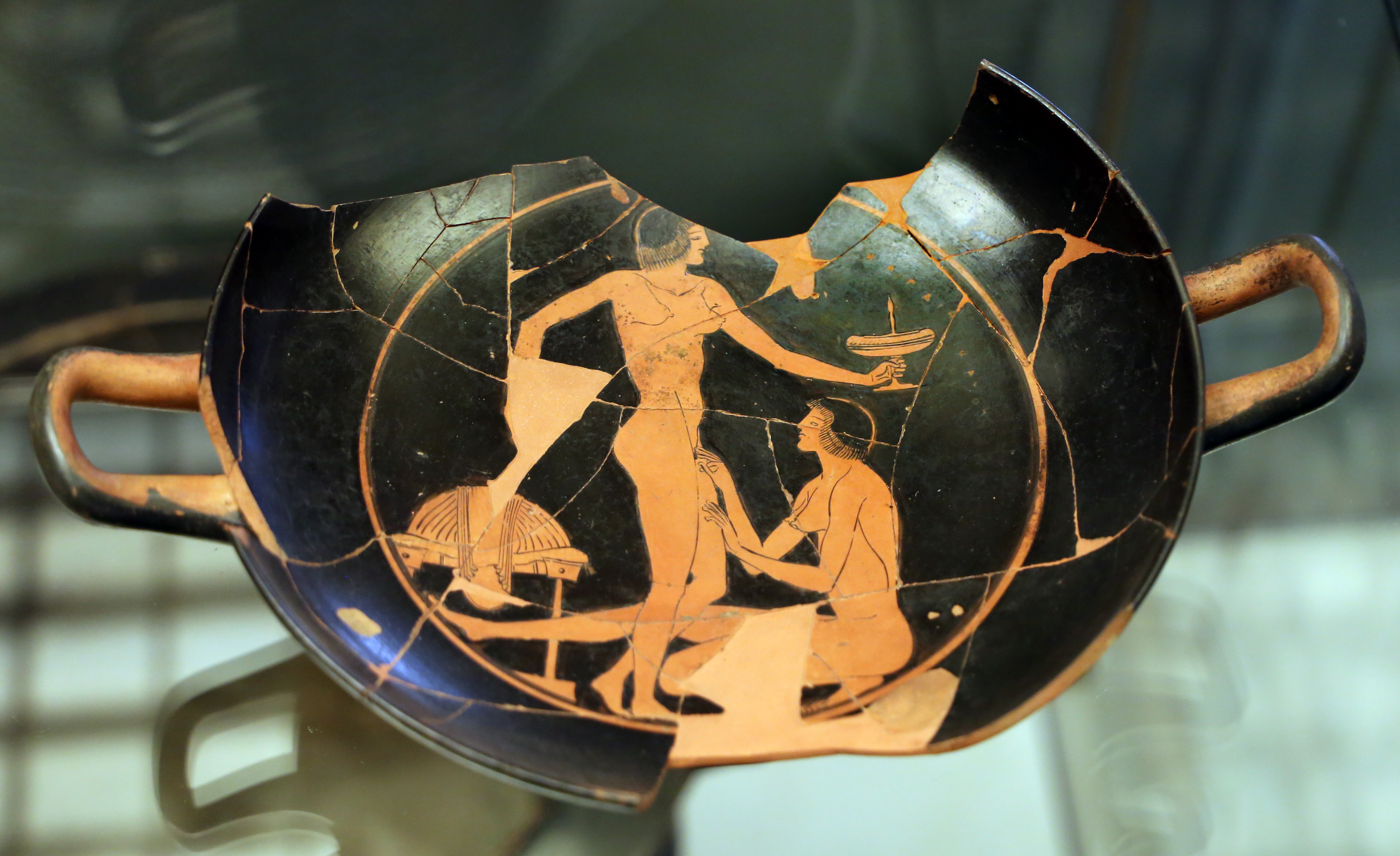
A red-figure kylix depicting two women in an intimate setting. The kneeling woman may be grooming or anointing the other, or it may depict lesbian intimacy. Attributed to the painter Apollodorus, c. 490–480 BCE. (Tarquinia National Museum)

In the A.D. 100s, in Lucian's Dialogues of the Courtesans, a female character admits to having lesbian sex, and talks about being pursued by two female characters.

=== Portrayals in Red Vase Pottery ===
Lesbian relationships also may be portrayed in ancient Greek pottery. Historian Nancy Rabinowitz argues that red vase images which portray women with their arms around another woman's waist, or leaning on a woman's shoulders can be construed as expressions of romantic desire. Women who appear on Greek pottery are depicted with affection, and in instances where women appear only with other women, their images are eroticized: bathing, touching one another, with dildos placed in and around such scenes, and sometimes with imagery also seen in depictions of heterosexual marriage or pederastic seduction.

== Scholarship and controversy ==
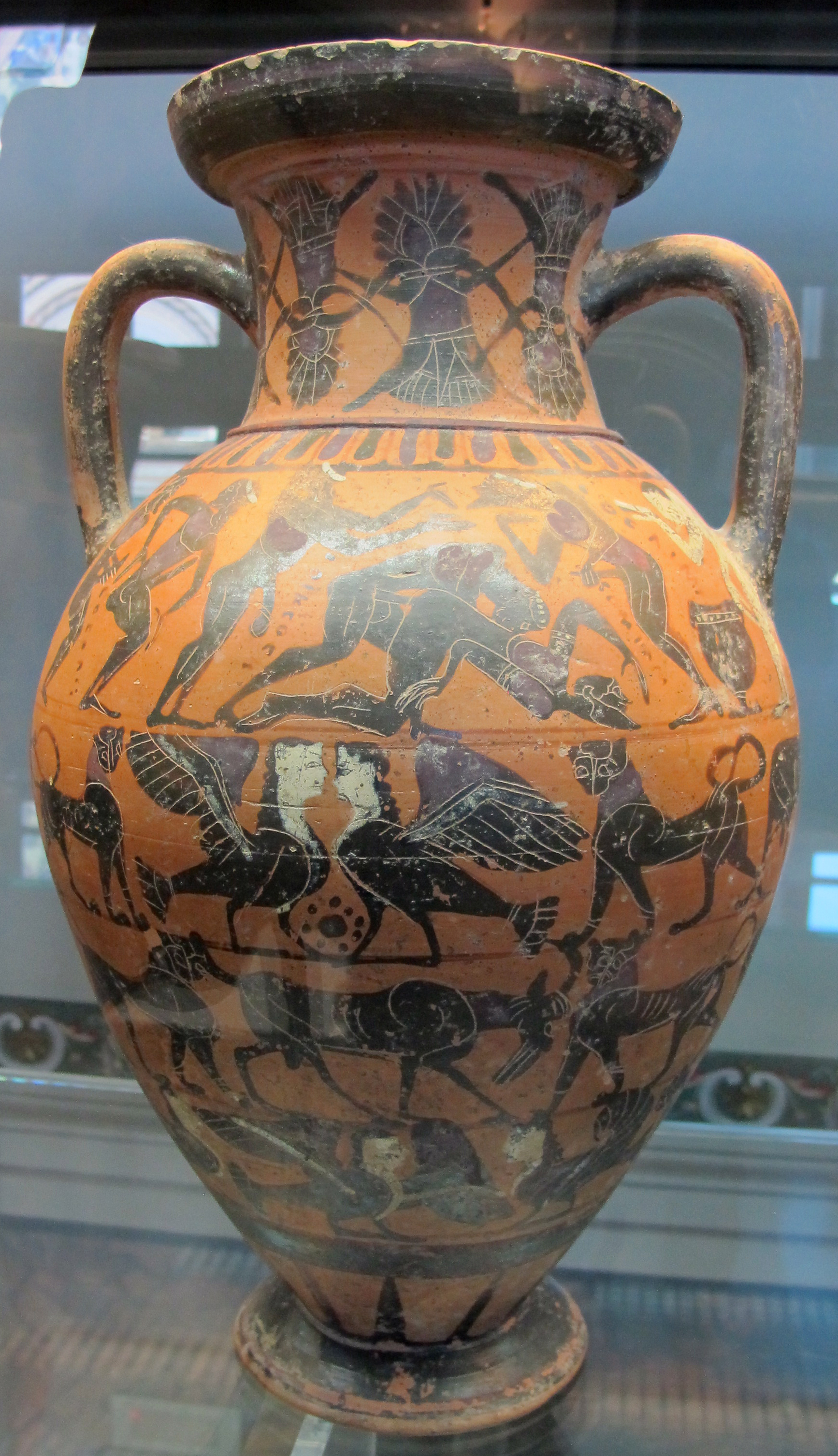
At the centre of the image is anal sex between two males. At the far left is a pederastic scene between two males. Tyrrhenian amphora. Around 565 - 550 BCE

After a long hiatus marked by censorship of homosexual themes, modern historians picked up the threads, starting with Erich Bethe in 1907 and continuing with K. J. Dover and many others.

Some scholars believe that same-sex relationships, especially pederasty, were common only among the aristocracy, and that such relationships were not widely practised by the common people (demos). One such scholar is Bruce Thornton, who argues that insults directed at pederastic males in the comedies of Aristophanes show the common people's dislike for the practice. Thomas Hubbard is another scholar who says that pederasty was not the norm and was highly problematized in ancient Greek society. Other scholars, such as Victoria Wohl, emphasize that in Athens, same-sex desire was part of the "sexual ideology of the democracy", shared by the elite and the demos, as exemplified by the tyrant-slayers, Harmodius and Aristogeiton. Even those who argue that pederasty was limited to the upper classes generally concede that it was "part of the social structure of the polis".

Other scholars, like David Halperin, say that Greek society did not distinguish sexual desire or behavior by the gender of the participants, but rather by the role that each participant played in the sex act, that of active penetrator or passive penetrated. Within the traditions of pederasty, active/passive polarization corresponded with dominant and submissive social roles: the active (penetrative) role was associated with masculinity, higher social status, and adulthood, while the passive role was associated with femininity, lower social status, and youth. But his views have come under heavy criticism from scholars like Griffin who suggested that Halperin exaggerated ideas drawn from Foucault. Griffin wrote that Halperin did not "succeed in disproving the natural reading of a number of Greek texts, which is that some forms of sexual activity were discountenanced, and that some people were categorized by their sexual activities."

Dover argues that pederasty was not considered to be a homosexual act, given that the 'man' would be taking on a dominant role, and his disciple would be taking on a passive one. When intercourse occurred between two people of the same gender, it still was not entirely regarded as a homosexual union, given that one partner would have to take on a passive role, and would therefore no longer be considered a 'man' in terms of the sexual union. Hubbard and James Davidson disagree, arguing that there is insufficient evidence that a man was considered effeminate for being passive in sex alone. For example, the lowborn protagonist of Aristophanes' play The Knights openly admits to having been a passive partner.

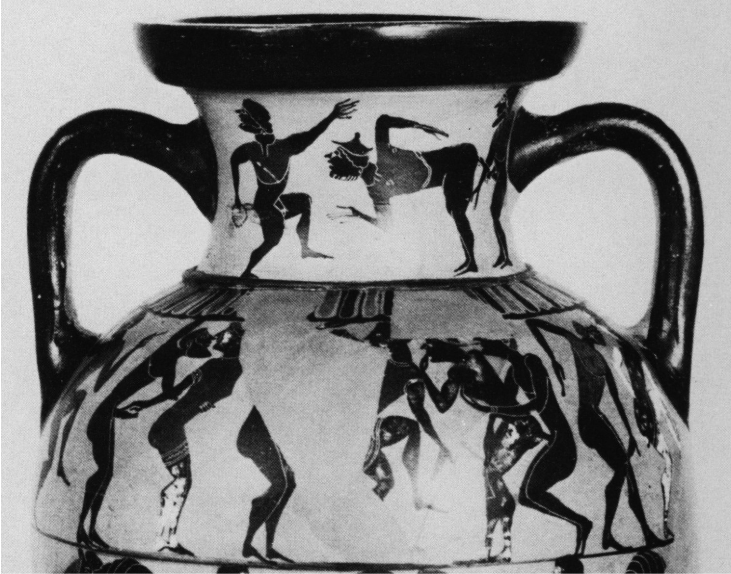
At the top of the image a male guides his penis towards a second male. Below are Komast dancers. Below and right is sex between a female and a male. Below and left is an erotic scene between a female and a male. Amphora. Timiades Painter. Around: 570 - 560 BCE.

Considerable controversy has engaged the scholarly world concerning the nature of same-sex relationships among the ancient Greeks described by Thomas Hubbard in the Introduction to Homosexuality in Greece and Rome, A Source Book of Basic Documents, 2007, p. 2: "The field of Gay Studies has, virtually since its inception, been divided between 'essentialists' those who believe in an archetypical pattern of same gender attraction that is universal, transhistorical, and transcultural, and "social constructionists", those who hold that patterns of sexual preference manifest themselves with different significance in different societies and that no essential identity exists between practitioners of same-gender love in, for instance, ancient Greece and post industrial Western society. Some social constructionists have even gone so far as to deny that sexual preference was a significant category for the ancients or that any kind of subculture based on sexual object-choice existed in the ancient world", p. 2 (he cites Halperin and Foucault in the social constructionist camp and Boswell and Thorp in the essentialist; cf. E. Stein for a collection of essays, Forms of Desire: Sexual Orientation and the Social Constructionist Controversy, 1992). Hubbard states that "Close examination of a range of ancient texts suggests, however, that some forms of sexual preference were, in fact, considered a distinguishing characteristic of individuals. Many texts even see such preferences as inborn qualities and as "essential aspects of human identity..." ibid. Hubbard utilizes both schools of thought when these seem pertinent to the ancient texts, pp. 2–20.

There is evidence that homosexual sex, or kinaidia, was outlawed in Classical Athens. Aristophanes Knights says a man called Gryttus was eliminated, and the scholiast to the line tells us that Gryttus was put to death. There is also philological evidence that one of the charges against Socrates was his sexual corruption of young men. Harry Tanner's The Queer Thing About Sin explores further evidence for homophobia in ancient Greece and Rome and ties it to societal crises.

During Plato's time there were people who were of the opinion that homosexual sex was shameful in any circumstances. In his ideal city, he says in his last, posthumously published work known as The Laws homosexual sex will be treated the same way as incest. It is something contrary to nature, he insists, calling it "utterly unholy, odious-to-the-gods and ugliest of ugly things".

The subject has caused controversy in modern Greece. In 2002, a conference on Alexander the Great was stormed as a paper about his homosexuality was about to be presented. When the film Alexander, which depicted Alexander as romantically involved with both men and women, was released in 2004, 25 Greek lawyers threatened to sue the film's makers, but relented after attending an advance screening of the film.

== Gallery ==
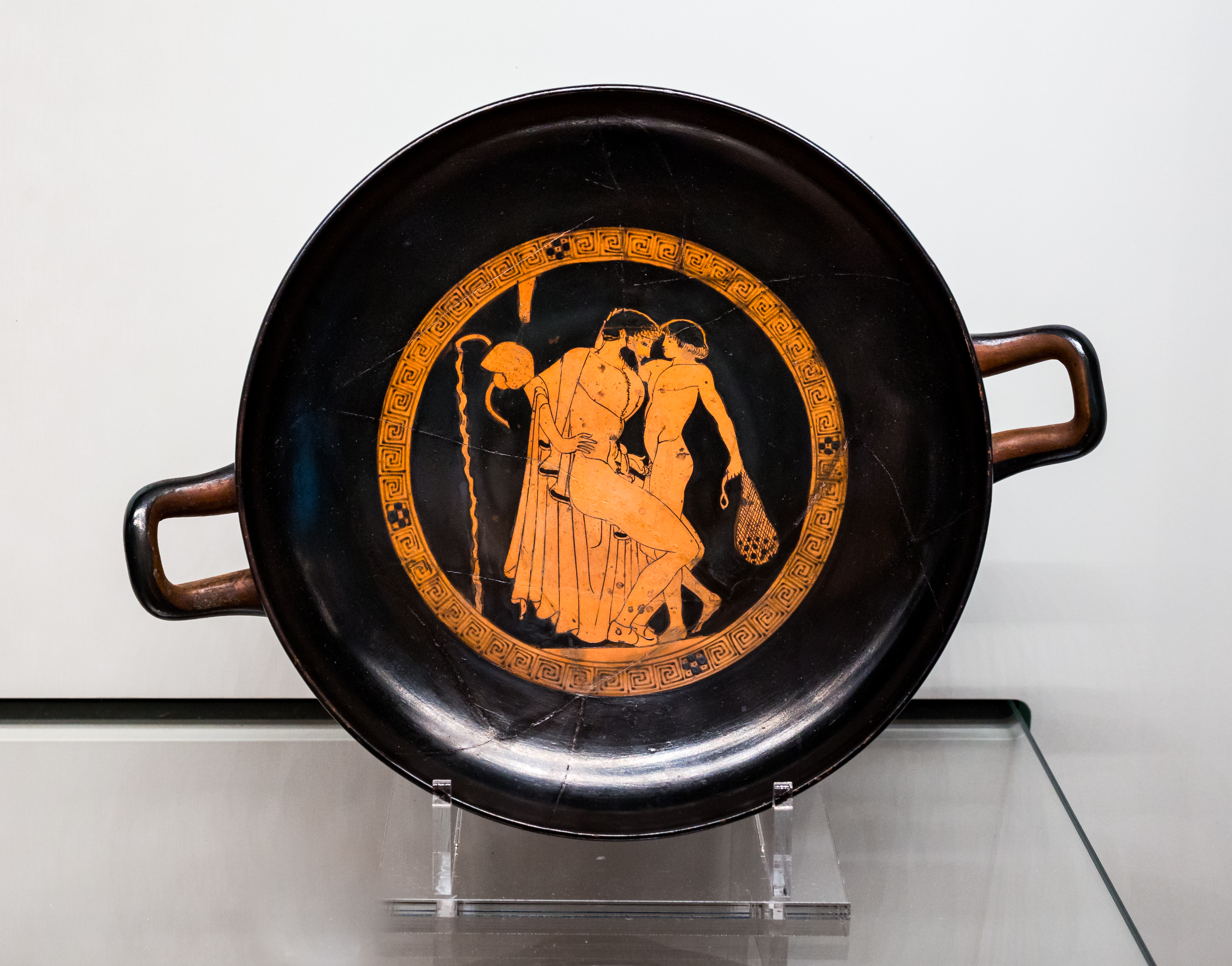
Attic kylix depicting a lover and a beloved. Brygos Painter. Around 485 - 480 BCE. Ashmolean Museum

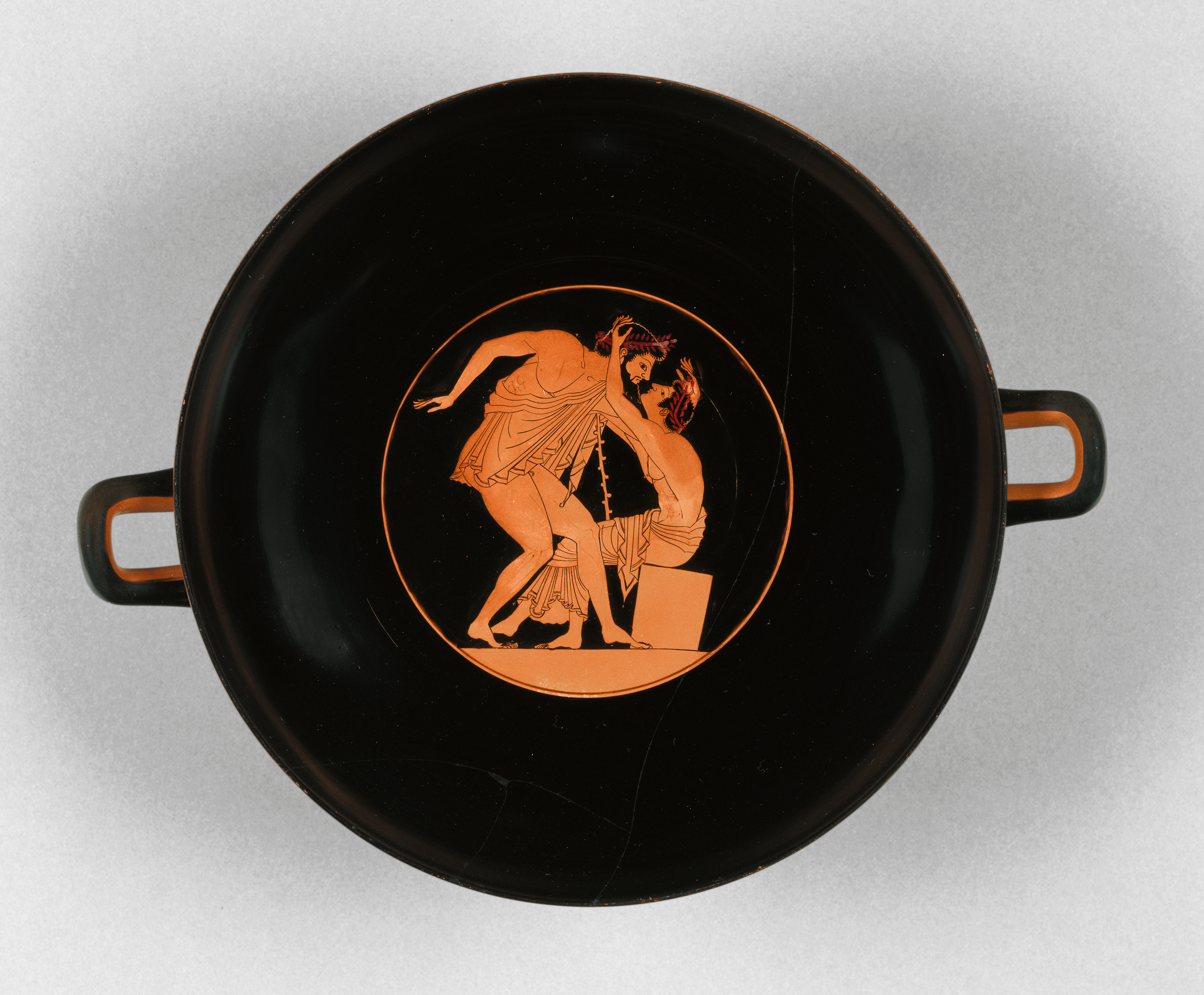
Pederastic scene. Kylix. Terracotta. Carpenter Painter. 510 - 500 BCE

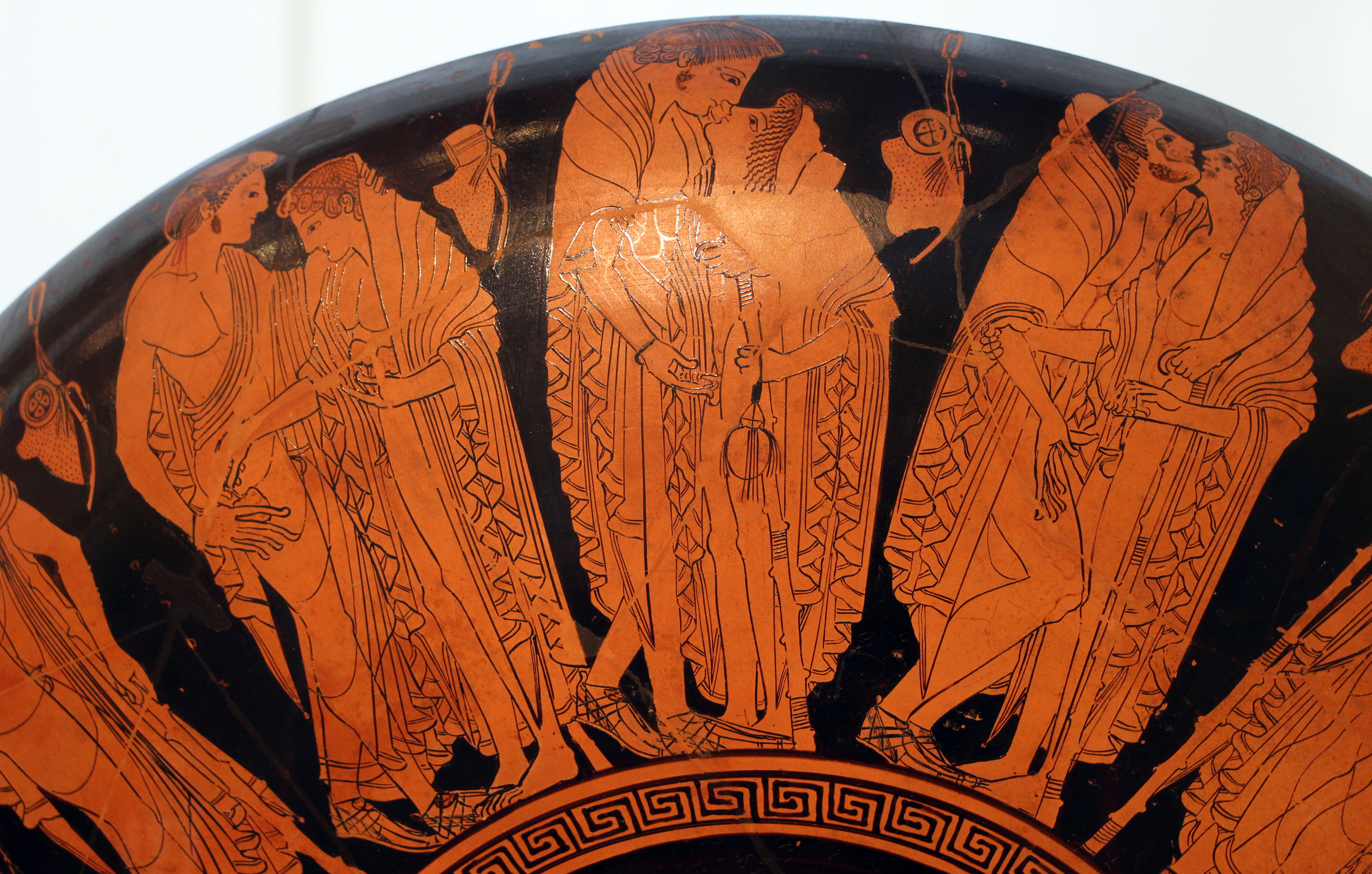
Pederastic couples. The outside of a drinking cup. Terracotta. Peithinos Painter. Around 500 BCE. Altes Museum

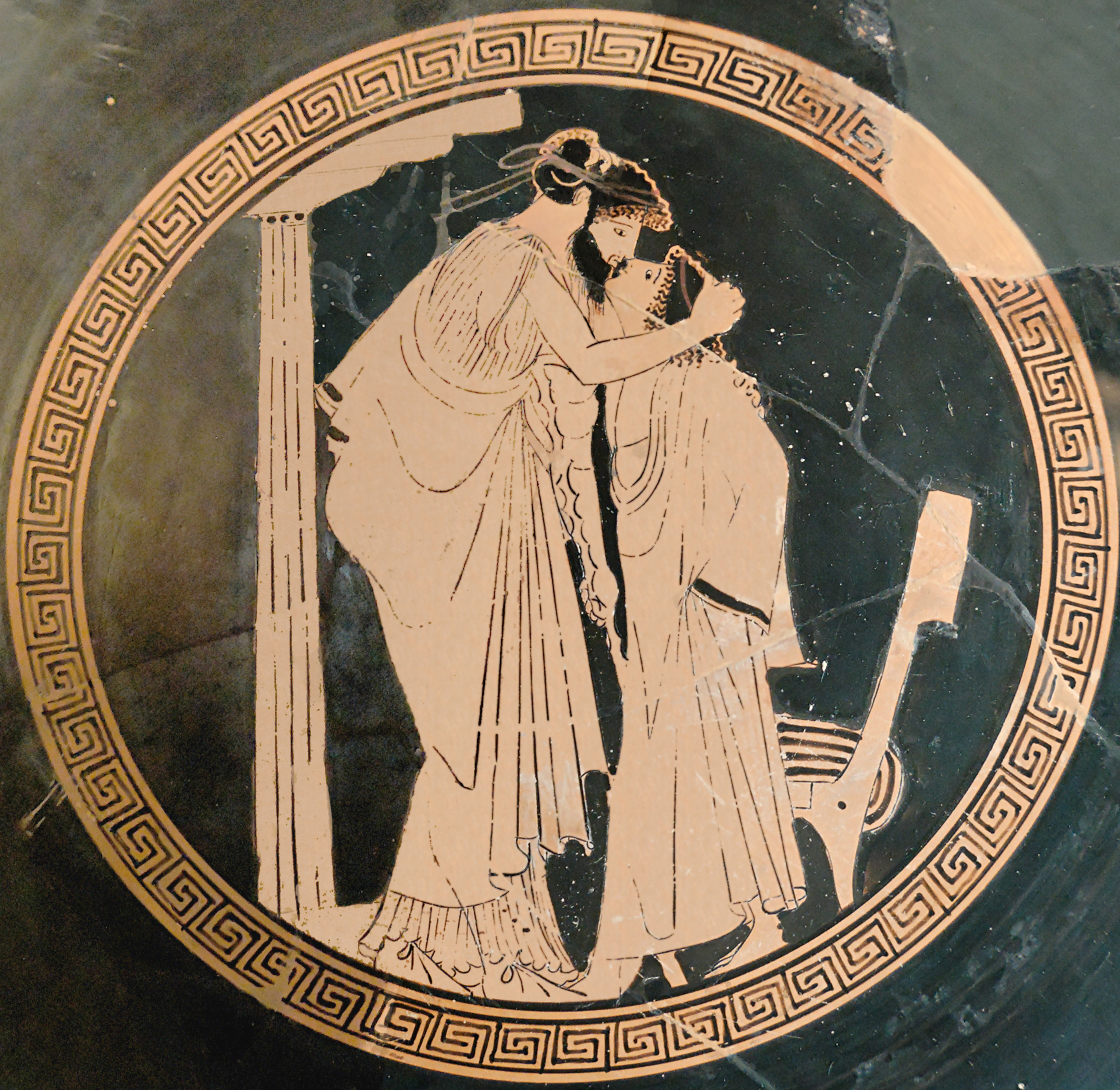
Attic kylix depicting a lover and a beloved kissing. Artist: painter of Briseis. Around 480 BCE. Louvre Museum

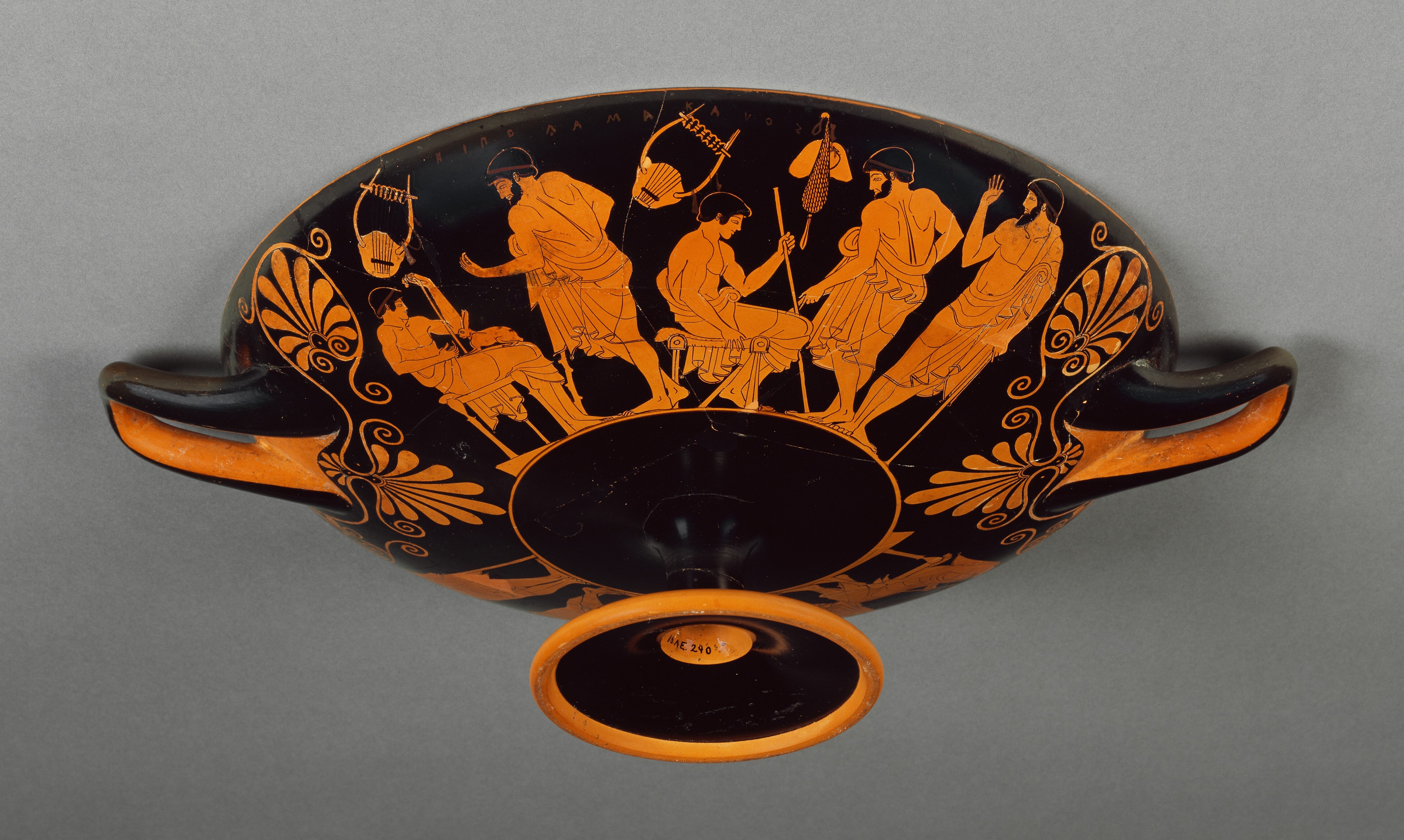
Pederastic courtship scenes. It has been commented that "Hares were popular love gifts in Athenian society...[and] ...a hare can be seen siting tamely on the lap of one of the seated figures." The outside of an Attic cup. Kylix. Artist; Douris. Potter; Attributed to the Python potter. Around 480 BCE. J. Paul Getty Museum

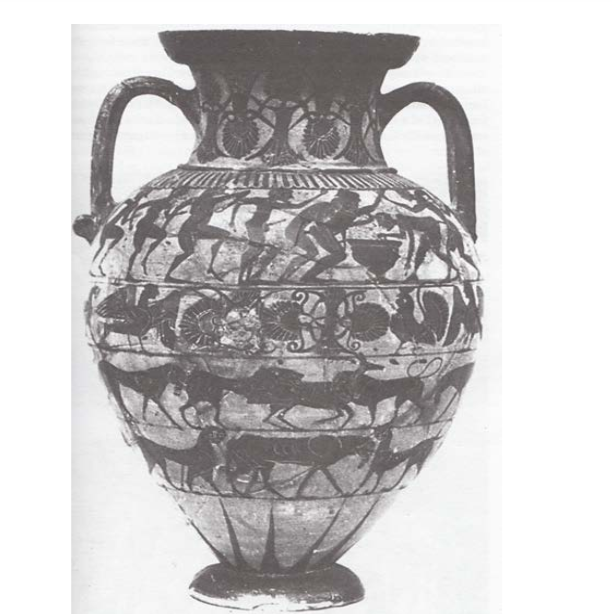
Pederastic sex. Tyrrhenian amphora. 560 - 530 BCE.

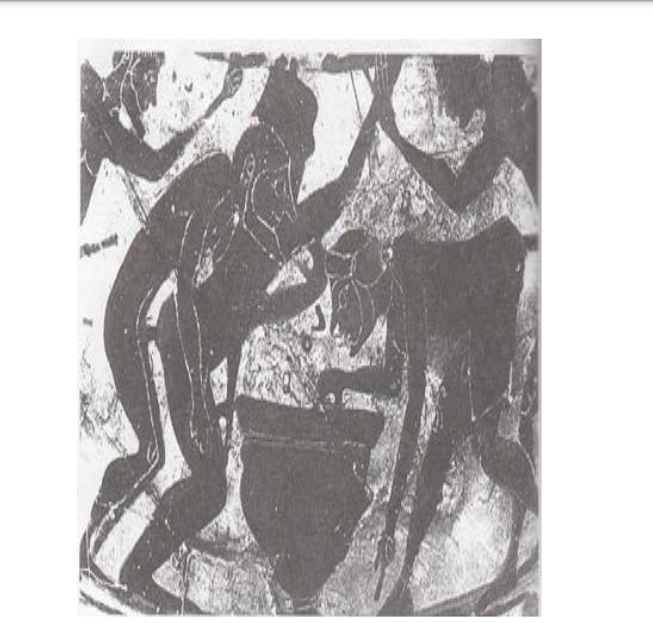
Pederastic sex. Detail of a Tyrrhenian amphora. 560 - 530 BCE.

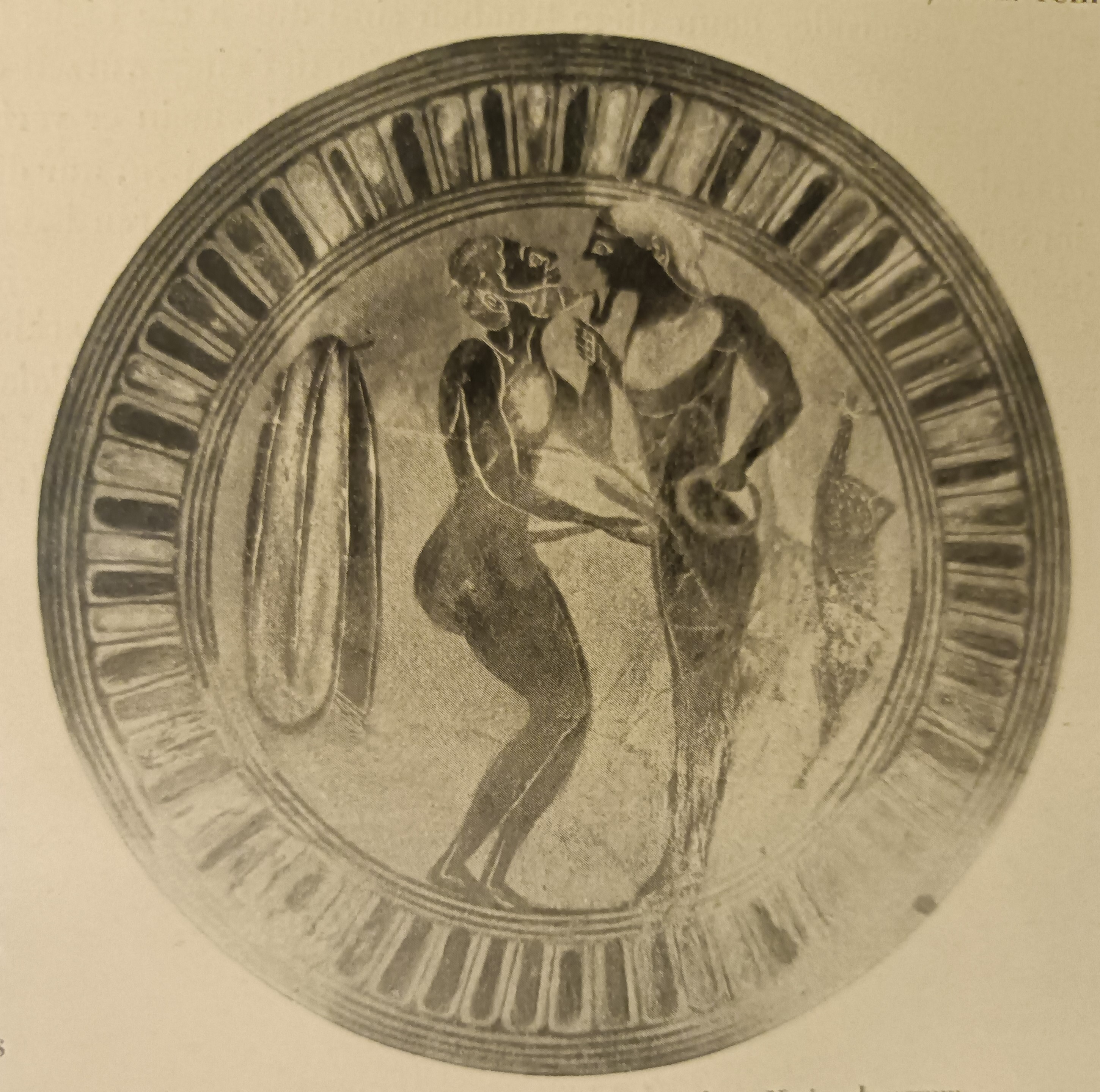
Pederastic scene. Bowl. Ancient Greek. Athens National museum

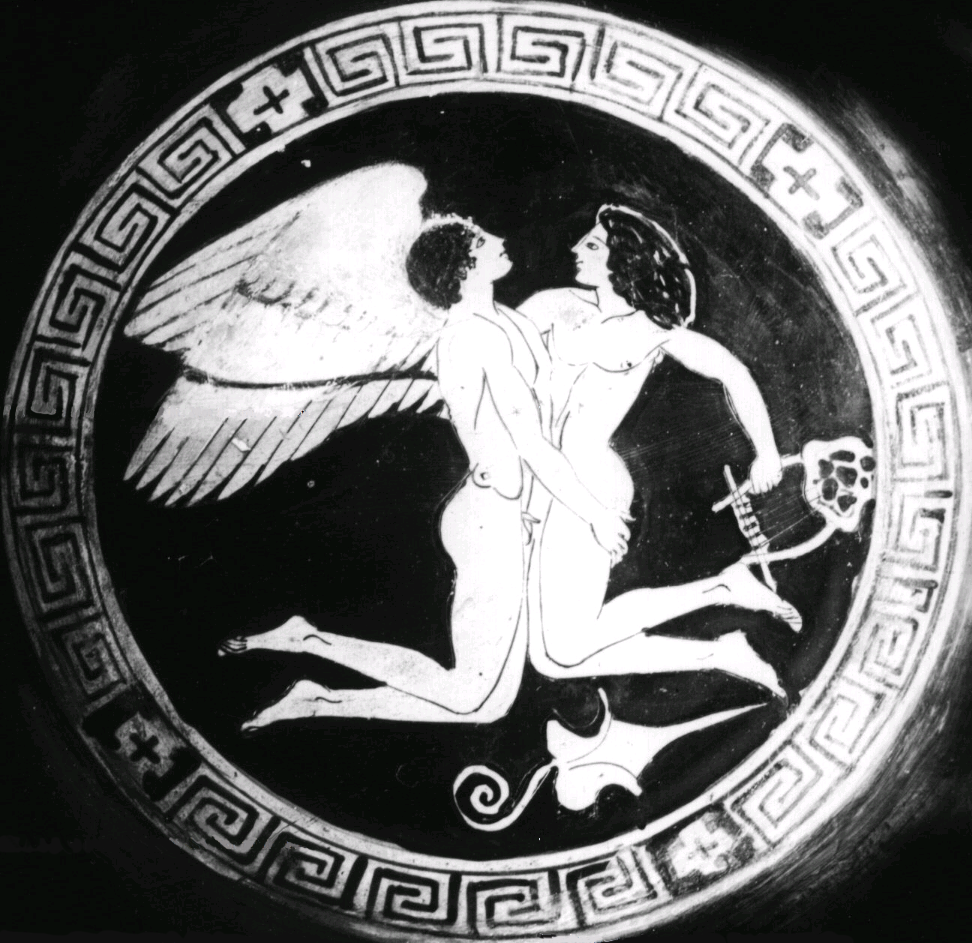
Hyacinthus and Zephyrus. Attic Kylix. 500 - 450 BCE

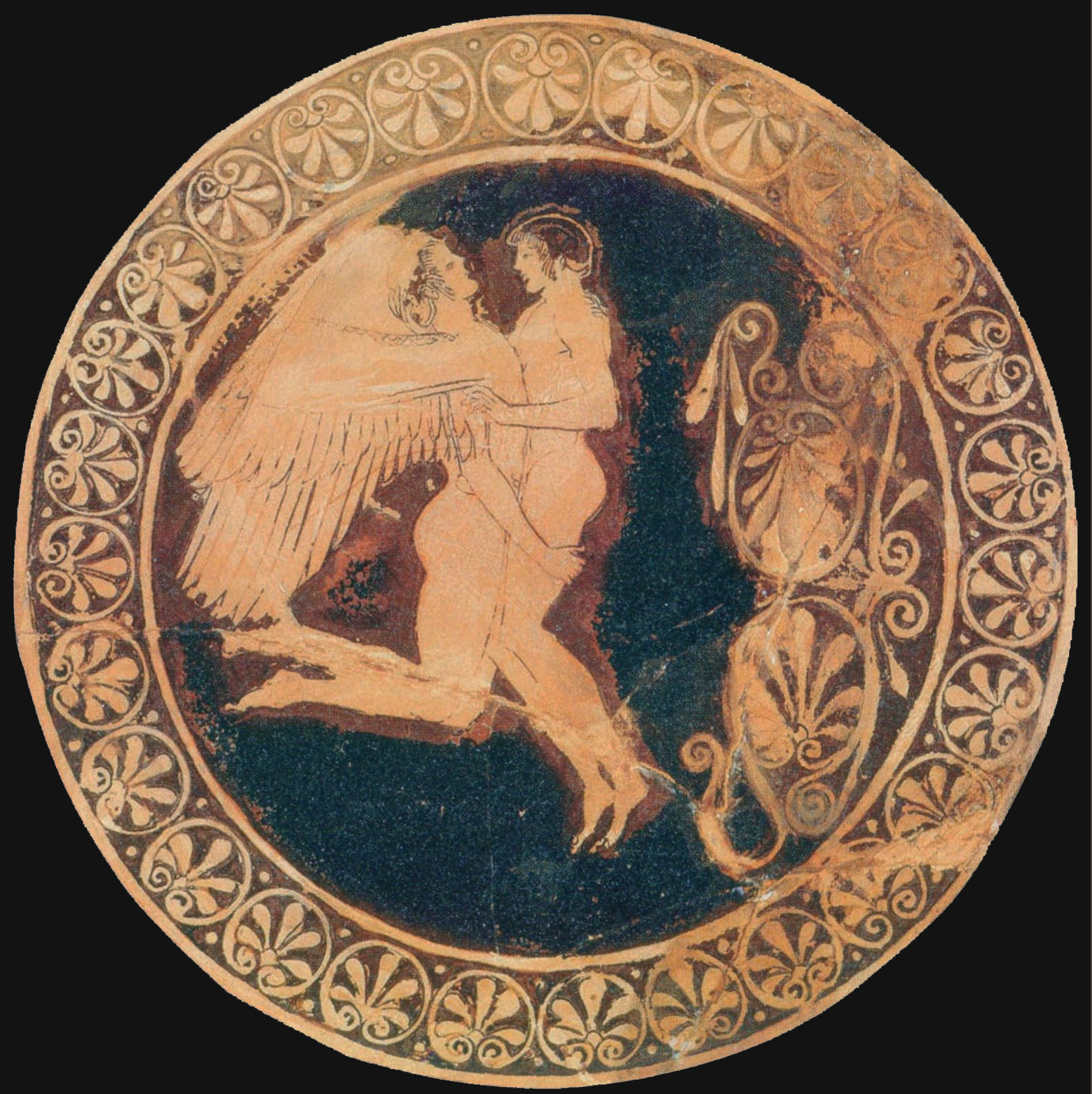
Hyacinthus and Zephyrus. Figure on the left may also be Eros. Around 480 BCE. Museum of Fine Arts, Boston

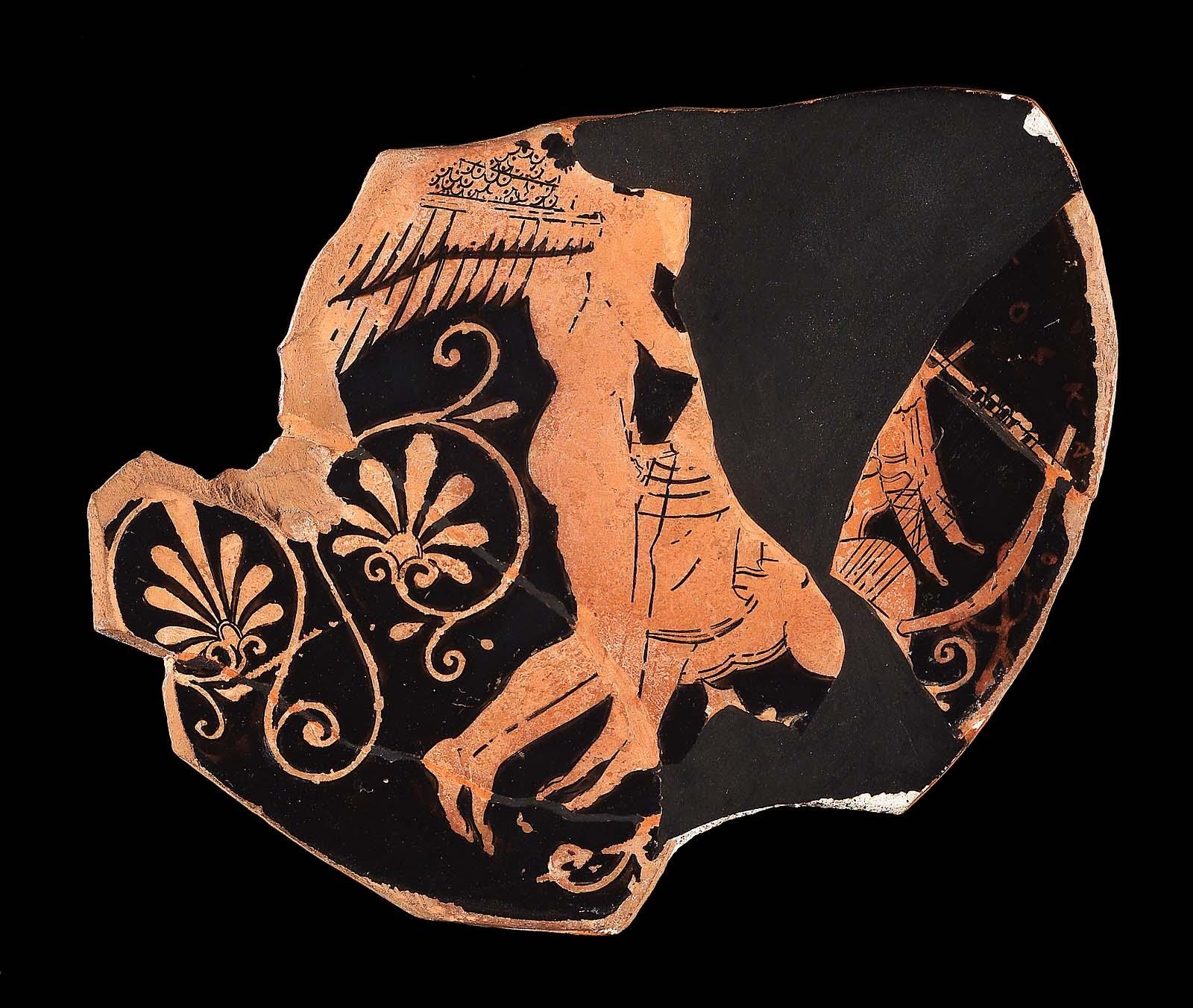
A fragment of a kylix with winged Eros and a boy. It shows Intercrural sex between the two figures. Around 490 to 480 BCE. J. Paul Getty Museum.

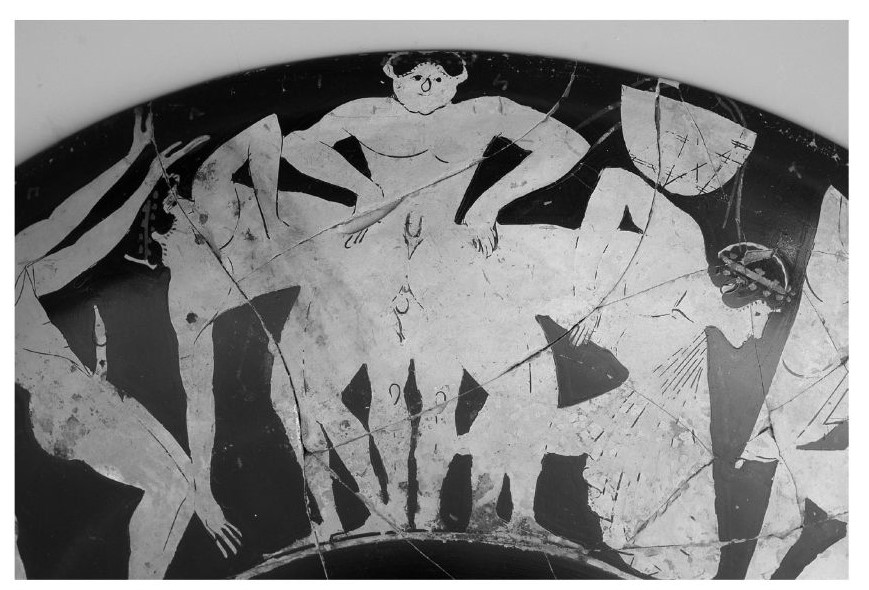
Two males bumping buttocks together. Two figures either side are dancing. Kylix. Attributed to the Manner of Epeleios Painter. 525 - 475 BCE

== See also ==
- Eromenos
- Erotic art in Pompeii and Herculaneum
- Greek love
- History of erotic depictions
- History of homosexuality
- History of human sexuality
- Homosexuality in ancient Rome
- Homosexuality in China
- Homosexuality in India
- Homosexuality in Japan
- Homosexuality in the militaries of ancient Greece
- Kagema
- LGBTQ rights in Greece
- Pederasty in ancient Greece
- Malakia
- Pederasty
- The Sacred Band of Stepsons
- Sacred Band of Thebes
- Wakashū

== Literature ==
- Calimach, Andrew, Lovers' Legends: The Gay Greek Myths, New Rochelle, Haiduk Press, 2002, ISBN 978-0-9714686-0-3
- Cohen, David, "Law, Sexuality, and Society: The Enforcement of Morals in Classical Athens". Cambridge University Press, 2004. ISBN 0-521-46642-3.
- Lilar, Suzanne, Le couple (1963), Paris, Grasset; Translated as Aspects of Love in Western Society in 1965, with a foreword by Jonathan Griffin, New York, McGraw-Hill, LC 65–19851.
- Dover, Kenneth J. Greek Homosexuality. Vintage Books, 1978. ISBN 0-394-74224-9
- Halperin, David. One Hundred Years of Homosexuality: And Other Essays on Greek Love. Routledge, 1989. ISBN 0-415-90097-2
- Hornblower, Simon and Spawforth, Antony, eds. The Oxford Classical Dictionary, third edition. Oxford University Press, 1996. ISBN 0-19-866172-X
- Hubbard, Thomas K. Homosexuality in Greece and Rome.; University of California Press, 2003. ISBN 0-520-23430-8
- Matuszewski, Rafal, Eros and sophrosyne. Morality, social behaviour and paiderastia in 4th-century B.C. Athens (Akme. Studia Historica no. 10), Warsaw 2011.
- Matuszewski, Rafal, "Same-Sex Relations between Free and Slave in Democratic Athens", in Deborah Kamen and C.W. Marshall (eds.), Slavery and Sexuality in Classical Antiquity. Madison: University of Wisconsin Press. pp. 104–123. ISBN 978-0-299-33190-0.
- Percy, III, William A. Pederasty and Pedagogy in Archaic Greece. University of Illinois Press, 1996. ISBN 0-252-02209-2
- Pound, Ezra (1917). Lustra of Ezra Pound with Earlier Poems. New York: Alfred A. Knopf. OCLC 1440346.
- Thornton, Bruce S. Eros: the Myth of Ancient Greek Sexuality. Westview Press, 1997. ISBN 0-8133-3226-5
- Wohl, Victoria. Love Among the Ruins: the Erotics of Democracy in Classical Athens. Princeton University Press, 2002. ISBN 0-691-09522-1
