= Homosexuality in the militaries of ancient Greece =

Homosexuality in the militaries of ancient Greece was a significant aspect across the ancient Greek city-states, ranging from being a core part of military life to being an accepted practice of some individual soldiers. It was regarded as contributing to morale. Although the primary example is the Sacred Band of Thebes, a unit said to have been formed of same-sex couples, the Spartan tradition of military heroism has also been explained in light of strong emotional bonds resulting from homosexual relationships. Various ancient Greek sources record incidents of courage in battle and interpret them as motivated by homoerotic bonds.

== Philosophical discourses ==
Some Greek philosophers wrote on the subject of homosexuality in the military. In Plato's Symposium, the interlocutor Phaedrus commented on the power of male sexual relationships to improve bravery in the military:

... he would prefer to die many deaths: while as for leaving the one he loves in a lurch, or not succoring him in peril, no man is such a craven that the influence of Love cannot inspire him with a courage that makes him equal to the bravest born

However, the Symposium is a dialectical exploration of the nature of true love, in which Phaedrus' views are soon found to be inadequate compared to the transcendent vision of Socrates, who:

...seizes this favourable moment in the talk at Agathon's party to suggest that visible beauty is the most obvious and distinct reflection in our terrene life of an eternal, immutable Beauty, perceived not with the eye but with the mind. He preaches no avoidance of the contest with appetite, but rather the achievement of a definite victory over the lower elements of love-passion, and the pursuit of beauty on higher and higher levels until, as in a sudden flash, its ultimate and rewarding essence is revealed.

Xenophon, while not criticizing the relationships themselves, ridiculed militaries that made them the sole basis of unit formation:

they sleep with their loved ones, yet station them next to themselves in battle ... with them (Eleians, Thebans) it's a custom, with us a disgrace ... placing your loved one next to you seems to be a sign of distrust ... The Spartans ... make our loved ones such models of perfection that even if stationed with foreigners rather than with their lovers they are ashamed to desert their companion.

Nevertheless, Xenophon's views are sympathetic to the idea that the relationship between erastes and eromenos in the military encourages soldiers to be brave, as he thought that the eromenos would feel particularly shameful if his erastes knew he acted in a cowardly manner during battle.

== Social aspects ==
According to tradition, the Greeks structured military units along tribal lines, a practice attributed to Nestor in the Homeric epics. The Theban military commander Pammenes, however, is supposed to have advocated military organization based on pairs of lovers:

Homer's Nestor was not well skilled in ordering an army when he advised the Greeks to rank tribe and tribe ... he should have joined lovers and their beloved. For men of the same tribe little value one another when dangers press; but a band cemented by friendship grounded upon love is never to be broken.

One such example took place during the Lelantine War between the Eretrians and the Chalcidians. In a decisive battle the Chalcidians called for the aid of a warrior named Cleomachus. Cleomachus answered their request and brought his lover along with him. He charged against the Eretrians and brought the Chalcidians to victory at the cost of his own life. It was said he was inspired with love during the battle. Afterwards, the Chalcidians erected a tomb for him in their marketplace and reversed their negative view of military homosexuality and began to honor it. Aristotle attributed a popular local song to the event:

Ye lads of grace and sprung from worthy stock
Grudge not to brave men converse with your beauty
In cities of Chalcis, Love, looser of limbs
Thrives side by side with courage

The importance of these relationships in military formation was not without controversy. According to Xenophon, the Spartans abhorred the thought of using the relationships as the basis of unit formation for placing too much significance on sexuality rather than talent. This was due to their founder Lycurgus who attacked lusts on physical beauty regarding it as shameful. Xenophon asserted that in some city-states the lovers would not even have conversations with one another. He said this type of behavior was horrible because it was entirely based on physical attractions:

If as was evident it was not an attachment to the soul, but a yearning solely towards the body, Lycurgus stamped this thing as foul.

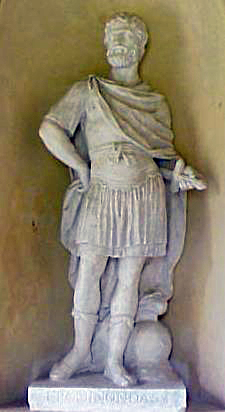
Epaminondas, leader of Thebes and the Sacred Band.

Nonetheless, city states that employed the practice in determining military formation enjoyed some success. The Thebans had one such regiment as the core of their entire army. They attributed this group called the Sacred Band of Thebes for making Thebes the most powerful city-state for a generation until its fall to Philip II of Macedon. Philip was so impressed with their bravery during the battle he erected a monument that still stands today on their gravesite. He also gave a harsh criticism of the Spartan views of the band:

Perish miserably they who think that these men did or suffered aught disgraceful.

One of the prominent Greek military figures enjoying such a relationship was Epaminondas, considered the greatest warrior-statesmen of ancient Thebes by many, including the Roman historian Diodorus Siculus. He had two male lovers: Asopichus, who fought together with him at the battle of Leuctra, where he greatly distinguished himself, and Caphisodorus, the latter died with him at Mantineia in battle. Epaminondas and Caphisodorus were buried together, something usually reserved for a husband and wife in Greek society. Another pair of warrior-lovers—Harmodius and Aristogeiton—credited with the downfall of tyranny in Athens and the rise of democracy became the emblem of the city.

The Roman Greek author Polyaeneus writes on the bravery of the Sacred Band of Thebes which he attributes to their shared passionate love for each other:

Gorgidas was the man, who first established the sacred band in Thebes; it consisted of three hundred men, who were devoted to each other by mutual obligations of love. And such was the effect of the passion, which they had conceived for each other, that they scarcely ever turned to flight; but they either died for each other, or bravely conquered.

Aside from a viewpoint of homosexual bonds as conducive to bravery, these relations are thought to have formed for a number of other reasons. Between some soldiers, who were often away from home and their wives, who with few exceptions could not follow their husbands on campaign, same-sex relations served as one of many outlets to satisfy their sexual desires. Indeed, marriage was not seen as the relation which would necessarily fulfill erotic desires. In particular for men, though they were expected to marry a woman, it was normal to engage in extramarital sexual relations.

Homosexual attraction sometimes existed in the form of pederasty, which influenced ancient Greek and especially Spartan military practices. This usually consisted in romantic relations and mentoring by adult men with male youths. Pederastic relations are thought to have played some role with Sparta’s overarching “contest-system” or the agoge, which aimed to shape male Spartans into soldiers.

The Spartan general Anaxibius is described as having died fighting with a youth he loved by his side, though the origin or social status of this youth is unclear as he is not described as a soldier. This relationship may have been an uncharacteristic extension of pederastic feeling to a youth who was not necessarily Spartan and possibly a slave, considering how he was accompanying rather than fighting alongside Anaxibius.

== See also ==
- Homosexuality in ancient Greece
- The Sacred Band of Stepsons
- Blood brother
