= Amphidamas (king of Chalcis) =

Amphidamas^{[(/æmˈfɪdəməs/]} (Greek: Ἀμφιδάμας) was the name of a historical king of Chalcis, who died about 730 BC after the Lelantine War; whose burial ceremony is associated with the poetic agon is mentioned by Hesiod.
