= Lelantine Plain =

Fertile plain on the Greek island of Euboea

A map showing the location of the Lelantine Plain (labels in Greek)

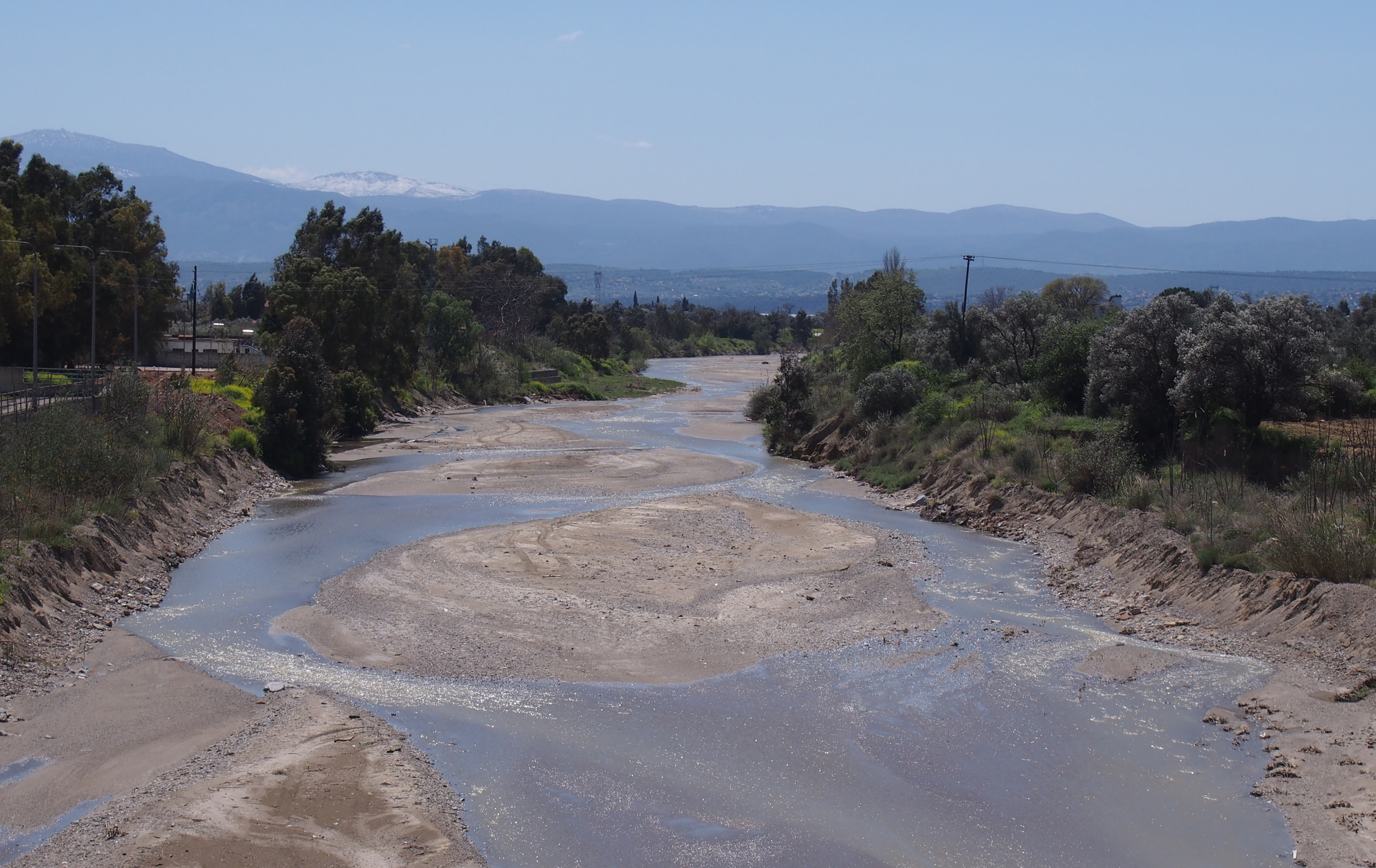
River Lilas (gr.Λήλας) in central Euboea, as seen from the bridge of the road that connects Chalkis and south and central east Euboea, looking south.

The Lelantine Plain (Ancient Greek: Ληλάντου πεδίον or Λήλαντον πεδίον; Modern Greek: Ληλάντιο πεδίο) is a fertile plain on the Greek island of Euboea, between Chalcis and Eretria. In the late eighth century BC a dispute over its possession was the cause of the Lelantine War. In the Middle Ages it was known as Lilanto; a Venetian document from 1439 describes a crisis caused by the powerful taking more than their share of the irrigation water:

and so many plots have remained unirrigated, and if things continue like this, the place Lilanto, which is the life of this island, will turn into a desolation - a place which provides more utility to the Signoria than any other, through being the eye and garden of Euboea.

It is presumably named for the Lelantos River (Ancient Greek: Λήλαντος), now the Lilas (Modern Greek: Λήλας), which runs through it, though ancient scholiasts derived it from the name of an otherwise unknown king Lelantos.
