= Pammenes of Thebes =

4th-century BCE Theban general

Pammenes (Ancient Greek: Παμμένης) was a Theban general of considerable fame who lived during the 4th century BCE. He was connected with Epaminondas by political ties and ties of friendship. When Philip, the future king of Macedonia, was sent as a hostage to Thebes (c. 368–365 BCE), he was placed under the care of Pammenes. A later source says that Pammenes was Philip's lover during this period.

Being a great promoter of the idea of using the power of eros in the military, Pammenes advocated military organization based on pairs of male lovers, considering this the only way to render a battalion invincible and contributing to the organization of the Sacred Band of Thebes created by Gorgidas:

Homer's Nestor was no tactician when he urged the Greeks to form in companies by clans and tribes, "That clan might give assistance unto clan, and tribes unto tribes," since he should have stationed lover by beloved. For tribesmen and clansmen make little account of tribesmen and clansmen in times of danger; whereas, a band that is held together by the friendship between lovers is indissoluble and not to be broken, since the lovers are ashamed to play the coward before their beloved, and the beloved before their lovers, and both stand firm in danger to protect each other.

In 369 BCE, when Megalopolis was founded, there was a concern that the Spartans would attack those engaged in establishing the community, Epaminondas sent Pammenes at the head of 1,000 specially picked soldiers to defend the community.

In 362 BCE, some of Megalopolitan colonists were in favour of dissolving the community, and returning to their own lands, and called upon the Mantineans and other Peloponnesians, for aid. The Megalopolitan settlers who opposed the dissolution of their community called for help to the Thebans, who sent Pammenes with 3,000 foot soldiers and 300 cavalry to their assistance. With this force Pammenes overcame all resistance, and compelled those who had left Megalopolis to return.

When Artabazus revolted in 356 BCE against Artaxerxes III, king of Persia, Pammenes led 5,000 Thebans to the aid of Artabazus, and overcame the forces of the king in two great battles. But Artabazus, suspecting that Pammenes was intriguing with his enemies, arrested him and handed him over to his brothers, Oxythres and Dibictus.
