= Cleomachus =

Ancient Greek warrior

- Born: Pharsalos
- Died: 7th century BC; Euboea
- Occupations: Soldier; Cavalry chief

Cleomachus (Greek: Κλεόμαχος) was an Ancient Greek warrior from Thessaly, notable for his defeat of the Eretrians in the Lelantine War.

Cleomachus was a widely known and celebrated soldier, and was called upon to fight by the Chalcidians in their war against the Eretrians. He agreed to fight and brought his mentee and companion to fight alongside him. After his mentee put on his helmet, Cleomachus, redoubled with courage, charged the Eretrian lines with his Thessalian cavalrymen and brought the Chalcidians to victory. Unfortunately, he was slain during the battle, but his courage inspired the Chalcidians and changed their opinions on mentorship, and they erected a tomb dedicated to him in the marketplace of Chalcis, the pillar of which still stood in Plutarch's days. Aristotle attributed a popular local song to the legacy of Cleomachus:

Ye lads of grace and sprung from worthy stock
Grudge not to brave men converse with your beauty
In cities of Chalcis, Love, looser of limbs
Thrives side by side with courage

Plutarch reveals an alternative name for Cleomachus, Anton, and that his beloved was called Philistus, mentioned by the poet Dionysius in the poem Causes.

== See also ==
- Homosexuality in the militaries of ancient Greece
