= Lelantine War =

War in Archaic Greece between Chalcis and Eretria

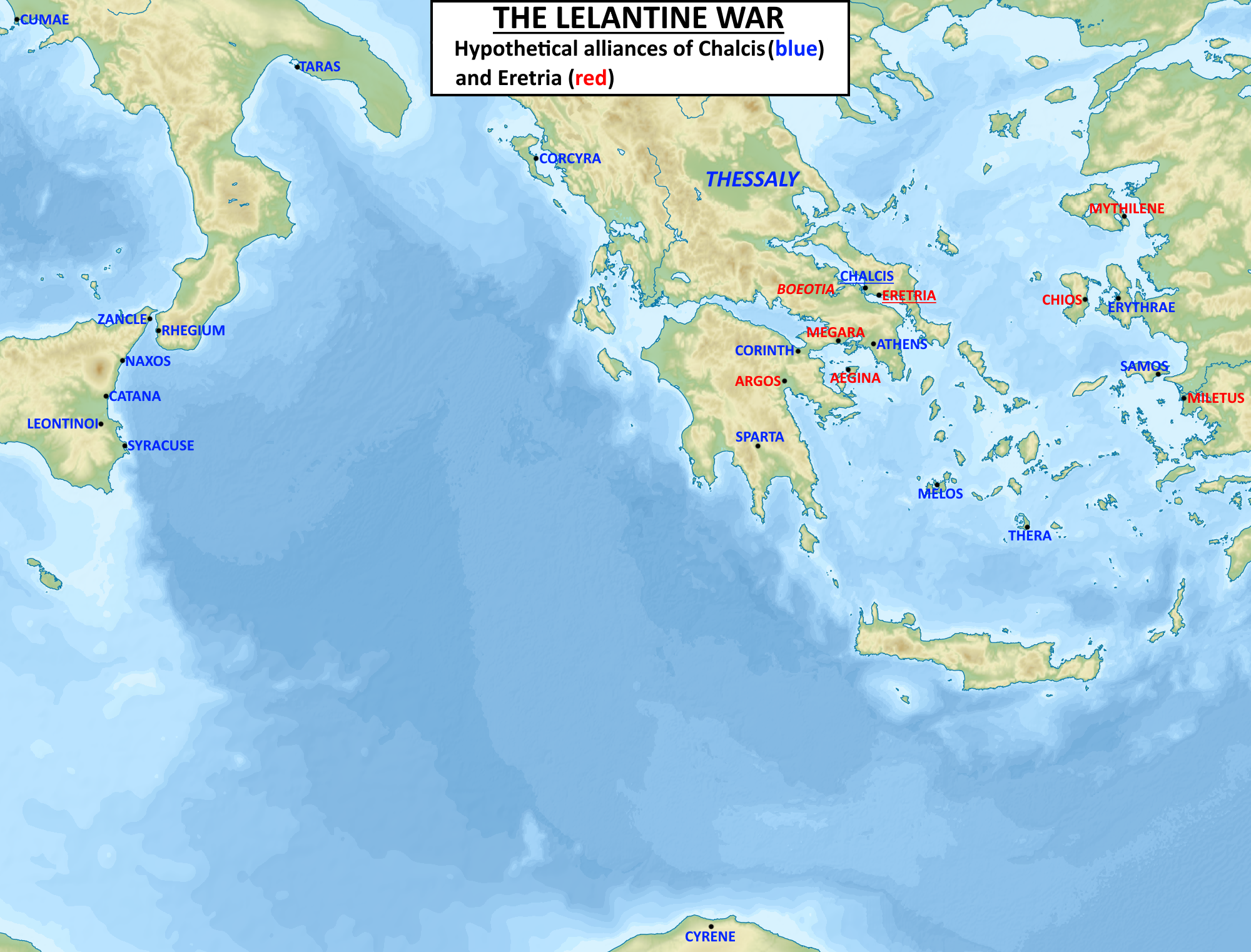
- Hypothetical alliances of Chalcis (blue) and Eretria (red) during the Lelantine War.
Date	c. 710–650 BC
Location	Euboea island, Greece
Result	Eretria and Allies victory
Territorial changes	Chalcis lost control of Andros, Tenos, Kea islands

Belligerents
Eretria and allies	Chalcis and allies

The Lelantine War was a military conflict between the two ancient Greek city states Chalcis and Eretria in Euboea which took place in the early Archaic period, between c. 710 and 650 BC. The reason for war was, according to tradition, the struggle for the fertile Lelantine Plain on the island of Euboea. Due to the economic importance of the two participating poleis, the conflict spread considerably, with multiple further city states joining either side, resulting in much of Greece being at war. The historian Thucydides describes the Lelantine War as exceptional, the only war in Greece between the mythical Trojan War and the Persian Wars of the early 5th century BC in which allied cities rather than single ones were involved.

Ancient authors normally refer to the War between Chalcidians and Eretrians (ancient Greek: πόλεμος Χαλκιδέων καὶ Ἐρετριῶν pólemos Chalkidéon kaì Eretriōn).

The war between Chalcis and Eretria was the one in which most cities belonging to the rest of Greece were divided up into alliances with one side or the other.

— Thucydides (I. 15, 3)

The length of the war, as well as the cities involved, and even the historicity of the Lelantine War remain debated among modern historians.

== Date of the war ==
There is no direct information in ancient sources to date this war. Indirect evidence in Thucydides points towards a date ca 700 BC, that situates it halfway between history and legend. At the very same time, the site of Lefkandi was being incrementally deserted, perhaps as a consequence of the turmoil. The foundation stories of the joint Euboean colony at Ischia suggest that at the mid-8th century Chalcis and Eretria were cooperating. Furthermore, Theognis can be read to imply there was a conflict between Eretria and Chalcis in the middle of the 6th century BC. While a few historians have suggested this as the date of the Lelantine War, it is more probable that Theognis refers to a second, smaller and even less known Lelantine War: "we are certainly not dealing with a 'Hundred Years Lelantine War'", remarks Robin Lane Fox.

== Sources ==
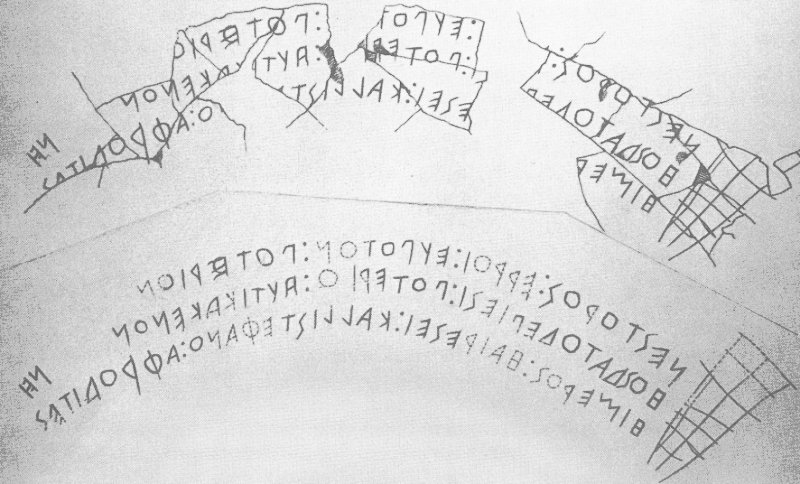
One of the oldest known Greek inscriptions, from "Nestor's Cup", a kotyle from the final third of the 8th century BC.

Since the conflict took place at an early point in Greek history, before historiography had developed, there are no contemporaneous written sources on the events. The few later sources and the much more copious archaeological evidence allow for a sketchy picture of the Lelantine War. However, as a result of the ambiguity of the surviving written sources, date and extent of the war are disputed among Classical scholarship. Some authors have even suggested that the war may be entirely mythical or even fictional.

=== Written sources ===
No detailed record of the Lelantine War was produced by a contemporary author (such as Thucydides for the Peloponnesian War), as Greek historiography only developed 200 years later, starting with the works of Herodotus. The Greek literary tradition as a whole started only in the late 8th century BC, with Homer. Therefore, the only contemporary sources about the Lelantine War are references in the early poets Hesiod and Archilochos. The first references in historical works are from the 5th century, two centuries after the events, and remain vague and brief.

In the introduction of his work on the Peloponnesian War, Thucydides (460 BC to early 4th century) gives a short summary of earlier Greek history, stating that there were no major collective military actions by Greeks between the Trojan War and the Persian Wars. As an exception, he mentions the War between Chalcidians and Eretrians, during which most of the rest of Hellas joined one of the warring parties:

There was no union of subject cities round a great state, no spontaneous combination of equals for confederate expeditions; what fighting there was consisted merely of local warfare between rival neighbours. The nearest approach to a coalition took place in the old war between Chalcis and Eretria; this was a quarrel in which the rest of the Hellenic name did to some extent take sides.

— Thucydides (I. 15) (Crawley translation)

Herodotus (484 BC to 425 BC) mentions the same war as the reason why in 494 BC, after the Ionian Revolt, Eretria sent military support to Miletus, then under threat from the Persian empire, attributing the support to Miletus having supported Eretria in her war against Chalcis, while Samos had taken the opposite side:

for the Milesians in former times had borne with the Eretrians the burden of all that war which they had with the Chalkidians at the time when the Chalkidians on their side were helped by the Samians against the Eretrians and Milesians.

— Herodotus (V, 99)

An even later author, Plutarch (c. 45 to 125 AD) mentions traditions regarding the Lelantine War twice. In his Moralia he states that during the war, the Chalcidians felt on a par with the Eretrian foot soldiers, but not with their cavalry. Thus, he writes, they procured the aid of a Thessalian, Kleomachos (Cleomachus) of Pharsalos, whose cavalry defeated the Eretrians in a battle. According to Plutarch, Kleomachos himself was killed during the battle and received an honourable burial as well as a commemorative column on the agora of Chalcis from her grateful citizens.

Kleomachos went with the Thessalian force to aid the Chalcidians; at what time it was evident that the Chalcidians were the stronger in foot, but they found it a difficult thing to withstand the force of the enemies' horse. (...) Kleomachos, being surrounded with some few of the flower of the Thessalian horse, he charged into the thickest of the enemy and put them to the rout; which the heavy-armed infantry seeing, they betook themselves also to flight, so that the Chalcidians obtained a noble victory. However, Kleomachos was there slain, and the Chalcidians show his monument erected in the market-place, with a fair pillar standing upon it to this day.

— Plutarch (Amatorius 17 (Moralia 760e–761b))

Elsewhere, Plutarch mentions the tradition of a poetic competition between Homer and Hesiod on the occasion of the funeral games of a Chalcidian nobleman called Amphidamas. Plutarch states that Amphidamas fell in the struggle for the Lelantine Plain, after performing several heroic deeds fighting the Eretrians.

It has been told us, that the most famous and eminent poets once met at the grave of Amphidamas in Chalcis. This Amphidamas was a leading citizen, one that had perpetual wars with the Eretrians, and at last lost his life in one of the battles fought for the possession of the Lelantine plain.

— Plutarch, Septem sapientium convivium, X 153f (Moralia 153f–154a)

Plutarch's source was traditionally attributed to Hesiod himself. Hesiod does mention, in Works and Days, a contest in honour of the late Amphidamas, but without mentioning Homer or linking Amphidamas to the Lelantine War.

Then I crossed over to Chalkis, to the games of wise Amphidamas where the sons of the great-hearted hero proclaimed and appointed prizes.

— Hesiod, Érga kaì hêmérai (Works and Days), 654–656.

In his Geographica, Strabo (c. 63 BC to 23 AD) reports that the two poleis, Chalcis and Eretria had once been friendly. He states that their former friendship resulted in both parties to the conflict agreeing before battle on contractually determined conditions, especially on not using missiles.

Now in general these cities were in accord with one another, and when differences arose concerning the Lelantine Plain they did not so completely break off relations as to wage their wars in all respects according to the will of each, but they came to an agreement as to the conditions under which they were to conduct the fight. This fact, among others, is disclosed by a certain pillar in the Amarynthium, which forbids the use of long distance missiles.

— Strabon (X 1, 11–12)

A similar agreement is indirectly referred to by Archilochos (7th century BC), the second contemporary author to refer to the Lelantine War. He tells how the "warlike lords of Euboea" will not use bow or sling, but only swords, in a coming battle.

Not many bows will be drawn,
nor will slings be common,
whenever battle will be joined in the plain;
instead the much-sighing work will belong to the swords,
for the warlike lords of Euboea are experienced in that manner of war.

— Archilochos (Anthologia Lyrica Graeca 1^{2}), 3 (Diehl) = Plutarch, Theseus V 2–3.

On the basis of these literary sources, and assisted by a variety of archaeological finds, modern scholarship has reconstructed an outline of the Lelantine War.

=== Archaeological evidence ===
Archaeological study has shown that the first warrior burials in the area of the later heroon of Eretria took place around 740-730 BC. The last such burial dates to around 690 BC. The site of Chalcis, still occupied, has been subject to little archaeological research, but similar burials of warriors are indicated by written sources, especially in reference to Amphidamas. Around 680 BC, a triangular building was erected atop the warrior graves at Eretria and used to dedicate offerings to the fallen heroes. This may be connected to a rekindling of the conflict after a lull or truce (see below), leading to the Eretrians seeking the aid of their dead heroes. The occupation of the Xeropolis settlement and use of the cemeteries at Lefkandi, situated between Chalcis and Eretria on the Lelantine plain, ceased at approximately the same time as the Lelantine war and the emergence of Eretria as a major archaeological site. The excavators have speculated that Lefkandi may have been the predecessor of Eretria and abandoned as the result of the victory of Chalcis in the war.

== Background ==
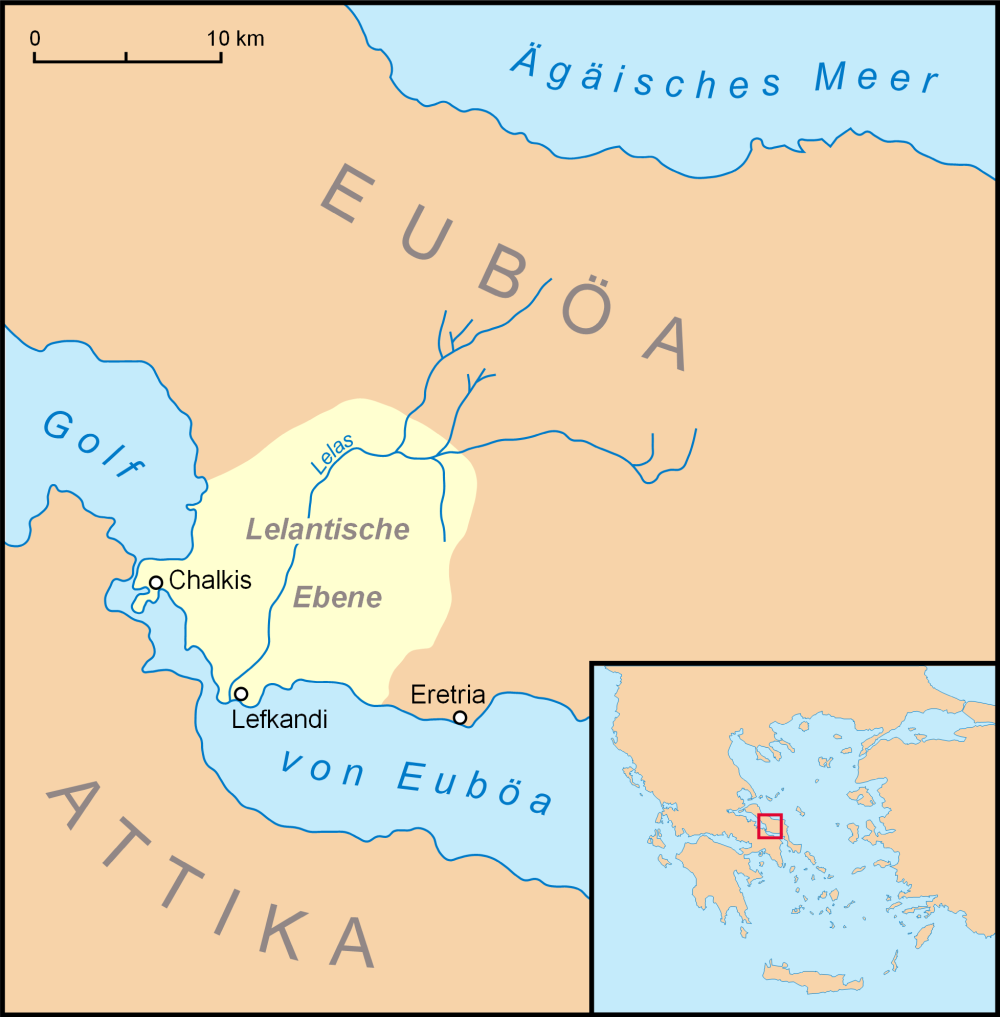
Chalcis and Eretria on the Lelantine Plain. Ägäisches Meer = Aegean Sea; Euböa = Euboea; Lelantische Ebene = Lelantine Plain; Golf von Euböa = Gulf of Euboea; Attika = Attica.

Chalcis and Eretria are ports on the west coast of Euboea. Both cities claimed the Lelantine Plain, perhaps originally made fertile by the river Lelas, which traverses the plain from north to south, as a natural border. Although, strictly speaking, Eretria is located outside the plain, it had a historical claim to it. The reason is that Eretria was probably initially the port for a mother town situated further west. That town was located at the mouth of the Lelas, near modern Lefkandi. Its ancient name is unknown, so it is generally called by that of the modern settlement. Lefkandi suffered heavy destructions in c. 825 BC, after which the majority of its population probably moved to Eretria.

Eretria and Chalcis originally had a political union with Athens as they were all of the Ionian tribe. Evidence of this is that the two Ionian seats in the Delphic Amphictyony were given to Athens and the Ionians of Euboea; Chalcis and Eretria. The two soon turned towards the nearby Cyclades islands and to locations further abroad for expansion and trade.

In the 8th century BC, Euboea was one of the economically strongest regions of Greece. The two leading powers of the island, Chalcis and Eretria were among the driving forces behind the apoikiai of the Mediterranean, acting for a long time not as competitors but as collaborators. Around the mid-8th century, they jointly founded Al Mina, a colony conceived to facilitate trade with the eastern Mediterranean. Roughly at the same time, they expanded westwards. Together with Kerkyra/Corfu, Eretria secured access to the western Mediterranean. Since the second quarter of the 8th century, Euboean traders were present on the island of Pithekoussai (Ischia) off the coast of Campania, to conduct trade with the Etruscans. A few decades later, Cumae, the first Greek colony on the Italian mainland was founded. Around 735 BC, Chalcis founded the first Greek colony in Sicily, a point which Thucydides saw as the true start of Greek colonisation. Shortly thereafter, Rhegion and Zankle were founded on either side of the strategically important Straits of Messina.

=== Reason for war ===
According to tradition, the war was caused by a conflict about the Lelantine Plain. This fertile area had for a long time been used for agriculture, including the cultivation of vines. In Greece, where fertile land is scarce, wars for agriculturally attractive terrain were not uncommon, especially in the Archaic period, e.g. between Megara and Athens. Nevertheless, it remains unclear why Chalcis and Eretria suddenly came to blows over the Lelantine Plain after apparently being in agreement on its use for a long time.

The origin of the conflict could be connected to a natural disaster. At the end of the 8th century BC, Attica, Euboea and other nearby islands suffered from a severe drought. It is likely that the Eretrian establishment on Andros was abandoned as a result. This drought and the attendant famine could have led to both Chalcis and Eretria laying claim on all of the Lelantine Plain.

== Course of the war ==
The war between Chalcis and Eretria probably began around 710 BC. Although both cities must have possessed large fleets, it was waged on land. Since the war took place before the development or introduction of hoplite warfare, but under exclusion of bows and slings, most of the combatants were probably lightly armed swordsmen. According to another view, the war consisted mainly of cavalry engagements. The relevant lines by Archilochus indicate that the war was still ongoing through the poet's lifetime (he is usually thought to have died c. 645 BC). It is possible, and likely, that the conflict was subdivided in several phases of warfare and ceasefires, as were e.g. the Peloponnesian War and the Messenian Wars.

=== Troops ===
Eretria at its height (a period brought to an end by this war) could field 3,000 hoplites, 600 cavalry and 60 chariots. This implies that this conflict took place at the transitional time between the Homeric aristos, entering the war on chariot and fighting his enemies like the heroes of the Iliad, and the classical hoplite. The size and numbers of Chalcis's forces are unknown. We only know that their infantry was superior and their cavalry inferior to that of Eretria.

=== Alliances and extent ===
Primarily, the war would have involved the two conflicting cities and their territories. At the time of the war, the state of Eretria included one quarter of the island of Euboea as well as the nearby Cyclades (Andros, Tenos, and Kea). The expansion of the conflict into other regions and the number of allies are disputed. There are direct references to three further participants apart from Chalcis and Eretria: Miletus on the side of Eretria and Samos as well as Thessaly on that of Chalcis. Beyond these, the enmities and alliances between Archaic Greek states known from other sources have led to further suggestions of parties involved, leading some scholars to propose up to 40 participants. Such numbers would, however, imply broad-ranging political alliance systems, which the majority of scholars do not consider likely for the 8th century BC. Even if multiple other cities were involved in warfare at the same time, it cannot, however, be argued that every conflict between Greek states of the time was part of this war. Thus, most scholars assume that, apart from the cities mentioned above, only Aegina, Corinth and Megara, and perhaps also Chios and Erythrai took part. However, there is speculation that the ongoing Messenian war between Sparta and the Messenian cities had also some connection with the Lelantine war, since there was a conflict between Sparta and Argos at the same time, with Argos perhaps joining with her neighbor Aegina on the side of Eretria and Sparta supporting Chalcis. Herodotus mentions a Samian expedition in aid of Sparta against the Messenians, and this would favor the hypothesis of Sparta siding with her and Chalcis in the Lelantine war. A war of Miletus against the island of Melos, which had affiliations with Sparta, gives additional evidence.

The island state of Aegina was mainly active in the trade with Egypt, where its major competitor was Samos. Samos was allied with Chalcis, which suggests that Aegina took the side of Eretria. Corinth and Megara were at war for practically all of the Archaic period, primarily because of the Corinthian conquest of the Perachora peninsula which had originally belonged to Megara. The actions of Chalcis and Corinth in the context of western colonisation suggest that the two cities were allied, or at least friendly; Chalcis had prevented Megarian settlers from establishing themselves at Leontinoi, while Corinth had driven Eretrian settlers from Kerkyra. In analogy, a friendship between Megara and Eretria is assumed. Herodotus reports that Chios supported Miletus in the Ionian Revolt, because Miletus had previously assisted the Chiotes against Erythrai. Thus, based on the allegiance of Miletus, an alliance between Chios and Eretria, as well as one between Erythrai and Chalcis can be suggested.

Most current scholarship is of the opinion that such long-distance alliances cannot have existed in the 8th century BC. Instead, there may have been alliance-like relationships based on personal ties among the aristocracy, so that the struggle involved only Eretria, Chalcis and the Thessalian aristocrat Kleomachos of Pharsalos with his own troops. The German historian Detlev Fehling believes that the entire Lelantine War is an invention of later centuries, produced by a chain of Pseudo-Nachrichten (pseudo-reports). This opinion has been generally rejected.

Around 700 BC, the Eretrian mother town at Lefkandi was finally destroyed, probably by Chalcis. This cut Eretria's link with the Lelantine Plain. At about the same time Eretria's ally Miletus ravaged the southern Euboean town of Karystos. During this phase, Miletus rose to be the dominant power in the eastern Aegean. The war (perhaps interrupted by truces) lasted until the mid-7th century BC. It may have been concluded, in favour of Chalcis, by the intervention of a Thessalian cavalry army, led by Kleomachos of Pharsalos, although it is not entirely clear whether the event in question decided the war, or indeed whether Chalcis definitely won it.

== Effects ==
After the long war Euboea, once the leading region of Greece, had become a backwater. The defeated Eretria and the probable victor Chalcis had lost their former economic and political importance. On the Mediterranean markets, Corinthian vase painting had taken over the dominant role previously occupied by Euboean pottery (see Pottery of ancient Greece). The leading role in colonisation was taken over by the poleis of Asia Minor, such as Miletus (eastern colonisation) and Phokaia (western colonisation). Chalcis entered a long decline while the islands in the Cyclades that Eretria controlled earlier seem to have become independent. From Theognis, another conflict over the Lelantine field is implied in the 6th century, so it seems the two cities fought again. In any case, after the war both cities continued the colonisation of the Chalcidice peninsula in the northern Aegean. Eretria felt compelled by the help Miletus had given her during the war to repay its debt by assisting Miletus during the Ionian Revolt. This led to Eretria's destruction prior to the battle of Marathon in 490 BC. Chalcis retained control of the Lelantine Plain until 506 BC, when Athens established a cleruchy in it.

== Bibliography ==
- Boardman, John (1957). "Early Euboean Pottery and History". Annual of the British School at Athens. 52: 1–29. doi:10.1017/s0068245400012867. S2CID 162393980.
- Bradeen, D.W. (1947). "The Lelantine War and Pheidon of Argos". Transactions of the American Philological Association. 78: 223–241. doi:10.2307/283496. JSTOR 283496.
- Burns, A.R. (1929). "The so-called 'Trade-Leagues' in Early Greek History and the Lelantine War". Journal of Hellenic Studies. 49: 14–37. doi:10.2307/625000. JSTOR 625000. S2CID 161942838.
- Donlan, Walter (1970). "Archilochus, Strabo and the Lelantine War". Transactions of the American Philological Association. 101: 131–142. doi:10.2307/2936044. JSTOR 2936044.
- Jonathan M. Hall, A History of the Archaic Greek World, ca. 1200–479 BCE, 2nd Edition, Chichester, Wiley Blackwell, 2014. ISBN 978-1-118-30127-2
- Lambert, S.D. (1982). "A Thucydidean Scholium on the 'Lelantine War'" (PDF). Journal of Hellenic Studies. 102: 216–220. doi:10.2307/631143. JSTOR 631143. S2CID 161821152.
- Murray, Oswyn (1993). Early Greece. London: Fontana. ISBN 0-00-686249-7.
- Parker, Victor (1997). Untersuchungen zum Lelantischen Krieg und verwandten Problemen der frühgriechischen Geschichte. Historia Einzelschriften. Vol. 109. Stuttgart. ISBN 3-515-06970-4.
