= Diocese of Dioclea =

Diocese of Dioclea or Diocleia, and also Dioklea or Diokleia may refer to:

Dioclea in Phrygia:

- Diocese of Dioclea in Phrygia, an ancient Bishopric of Dioclea in Phrygia (Asia Minor)
- Greek Orthodox Diocese of Dioclea in Phrygia, a former bishopric (since 2007 titular archbishopric) of the Patriarchate of Constantinople; see also Kallistos Ware
- Roman Catholic Diocese of Dioclea in Phrygia, a titular Roman Catholic bishopric, currently vacant; see also it:Diocesi di Dioclea di Frigia

Dioclea in Praevalitana:

- Diocese of Dioclea in Praevalitana, an ancient Bishopric of Duklja, near modern Podgorica in Montenegro
- Serbian Orthodox Diocese of Dioclea, a titular bishopric of the Serbian Orthodox Church

== See also ==
- Doclea (disambiguation)
- Dioclea (disambiguation)
- Diocletianopolis (disambiguation)
