= Pederasty in ancient Greece =

Social institution of ancient Greece

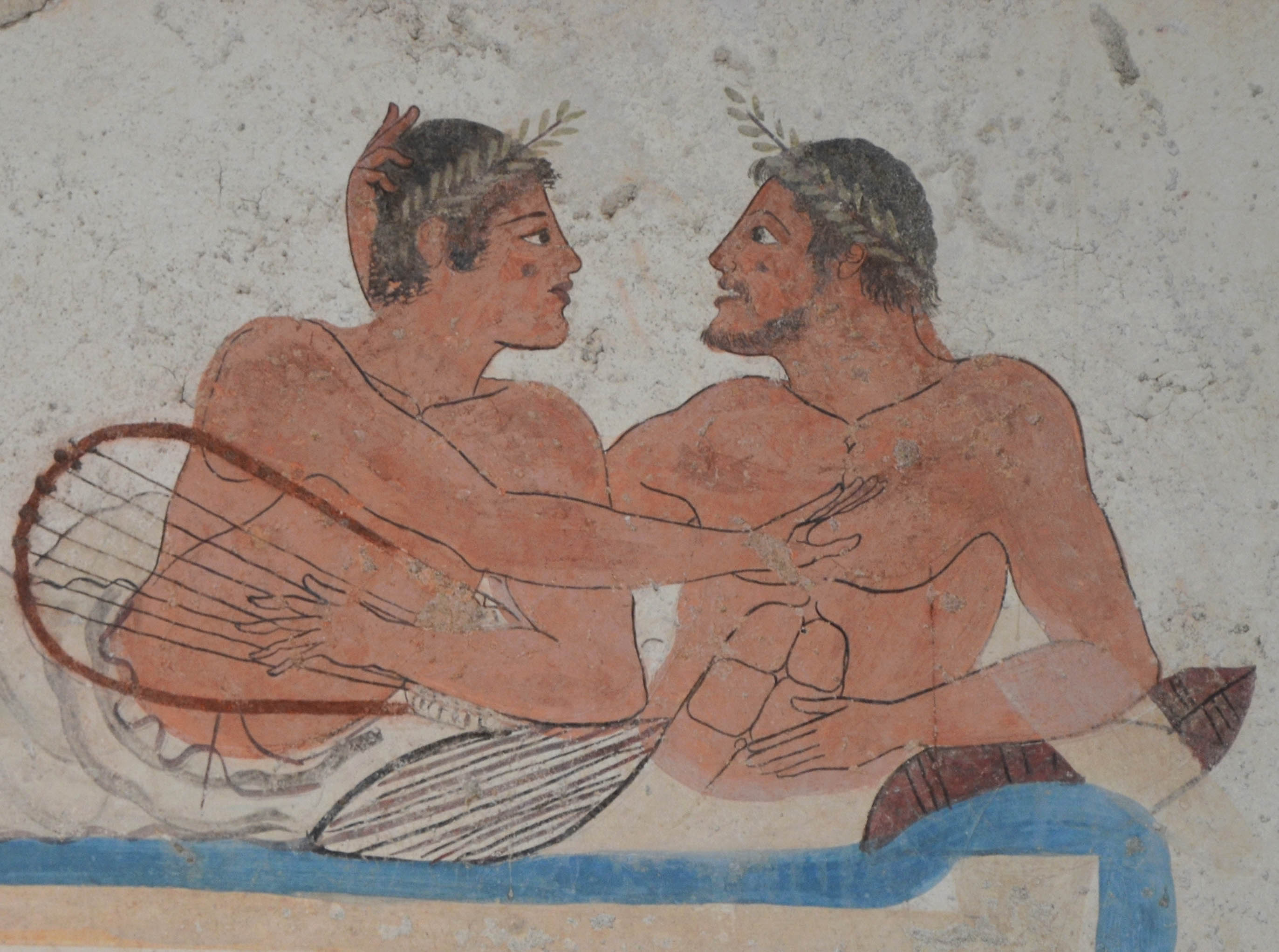
A pederastic couple at a symposium sharing a couch. It has been commented that the figure on the right is seeking a kiss from the figure on the left. A wall painting from the Tomb of the Diver from the Greek town of Paestum in Italy. 470 BCE

In Ancient Greece, pederasty was a socially acknowledged relationship between an older male (the erastes) and a younger male (the eromenos) usually in his teens.

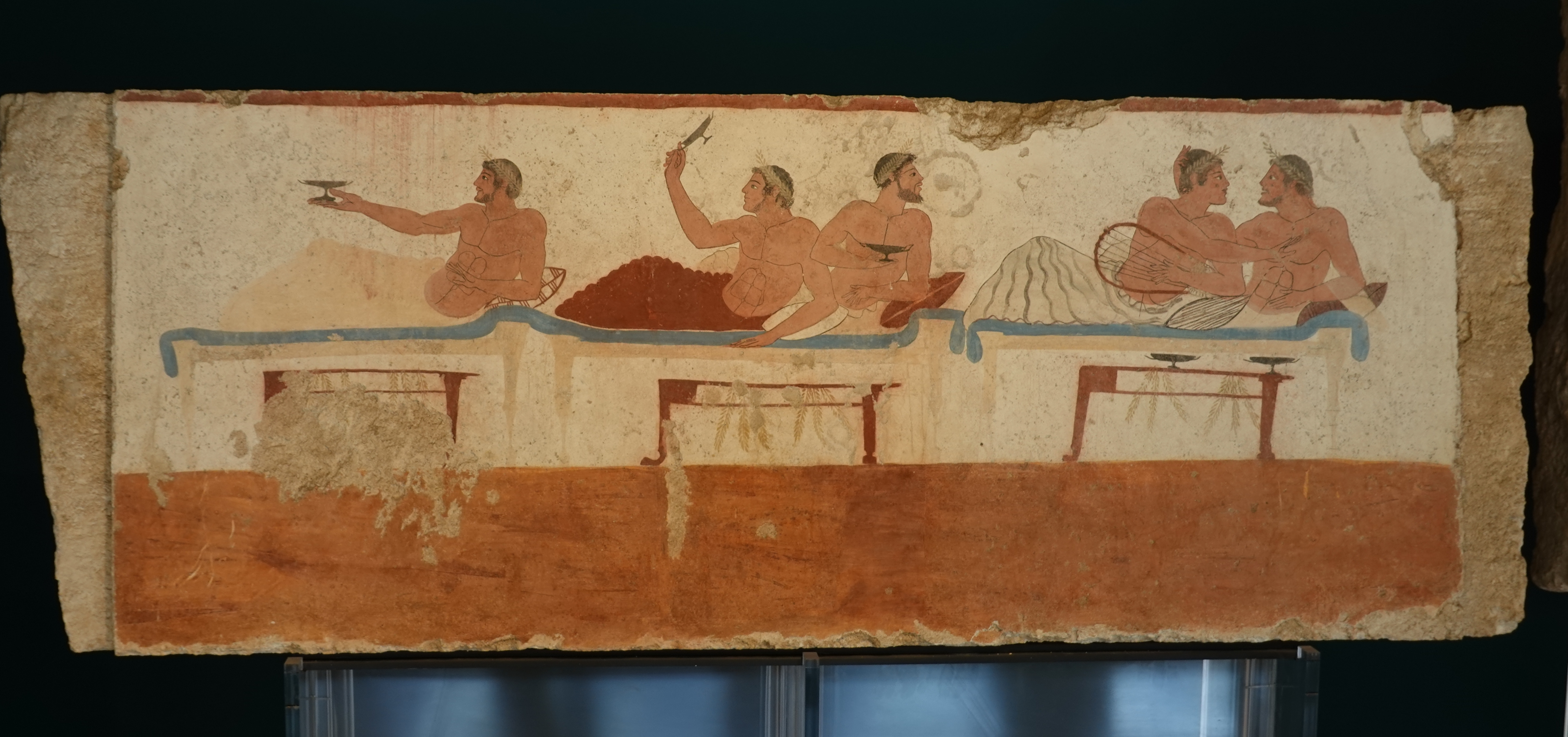
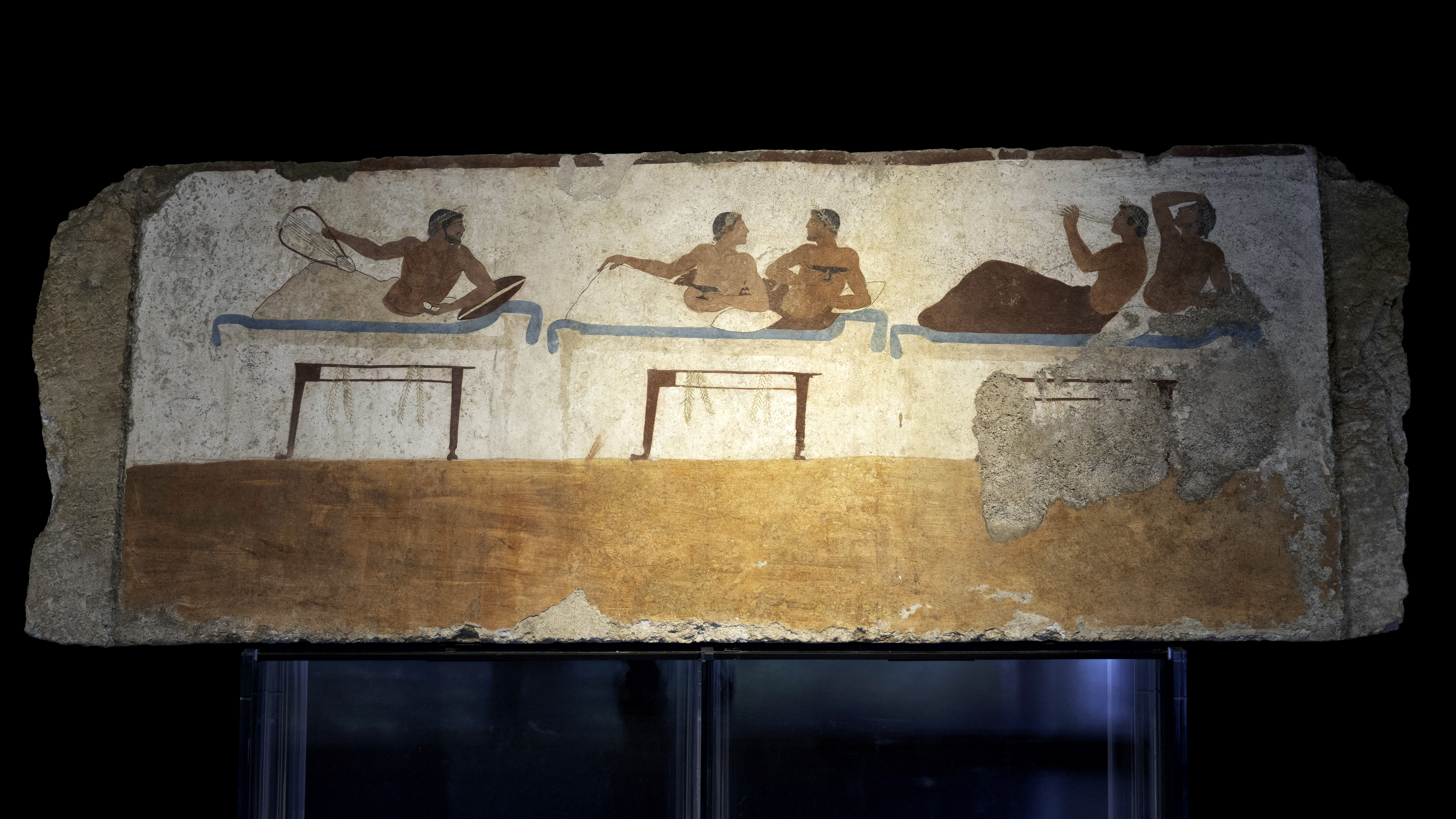
Two frescos with each showing pederastic couples at a symposium. Frescos from the Tomb of the Diver. Top image is from the north wall. Bottom image from the south wall. 470 BCE

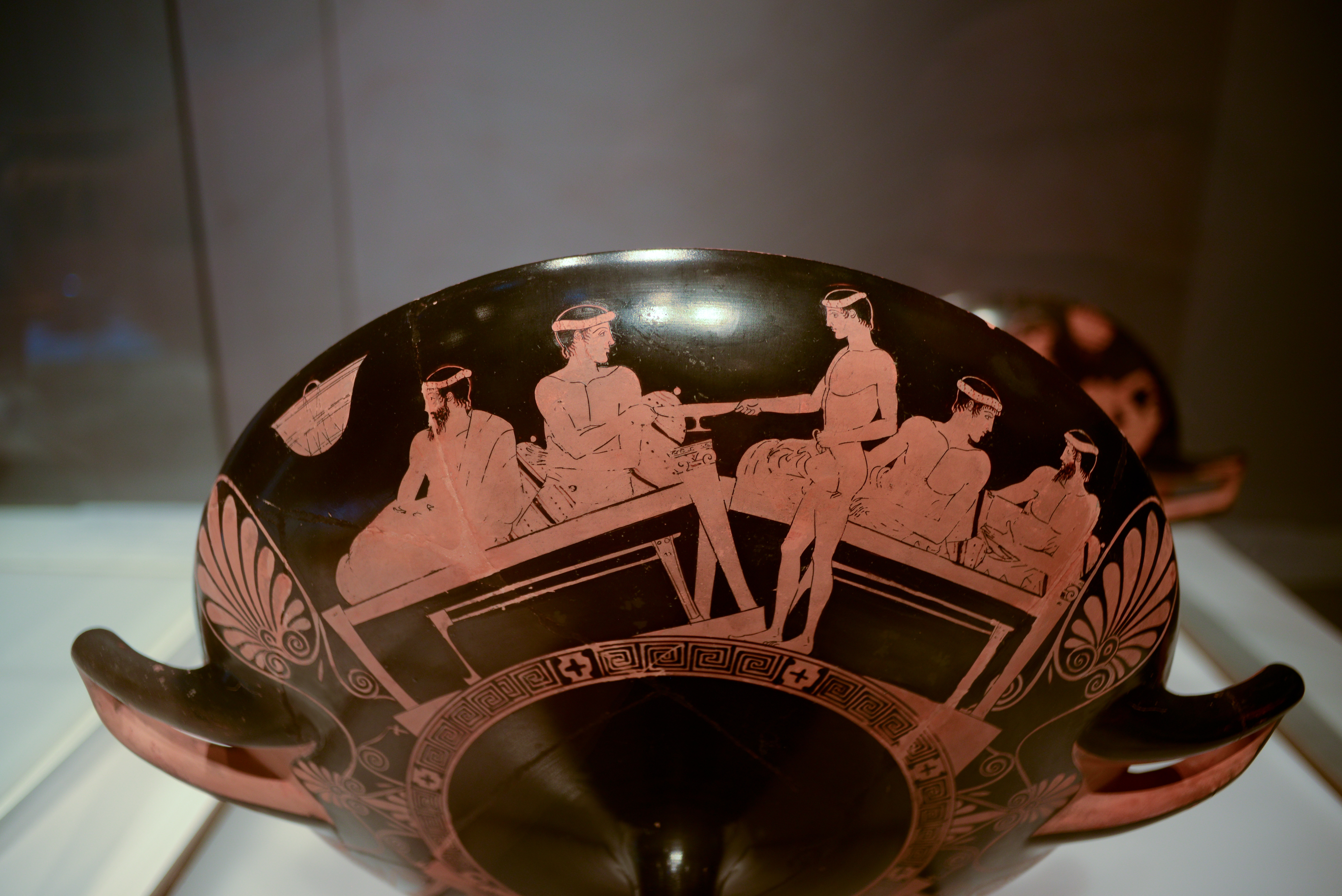
Pederastic couples. Boy at centre is holding an oenochoe in his left hand and giving a kylix to a person on a couch in his right hand. Attic kylix. Around 460-450 BCE

Some scholars locate its origin in initiation ritual, particularly rites of passage on Crete, where it was associated with entrance into military life and the religion of Zeus. It has no formal existence in the Homeric epics, and may have developed in the late 7th century BC as an aspect of Greek homosocial culture, which was characterized also by athletic and artistic nudity, delayed marriage for aristocrats, symposia, and the social seclusion of women.

Pederasty was both idealized and criticized in ancient literature and philosophy. The argument has recently been made that pederasty was idealized in Archaic period; criticism began in Athens as part of the general Classical Athenian reassessment of Archaic culture.

Scholars have debated the role or extent of pederasty, which is likely to have varied according to local custom and individual inclination. The English word "pederasty" in present-day usage might imply the abuse of minors in certain jurisdictions, but Athenian law, for instance, recognized both consent and age as factors in regulating sexual behavior.

== Terminology ==
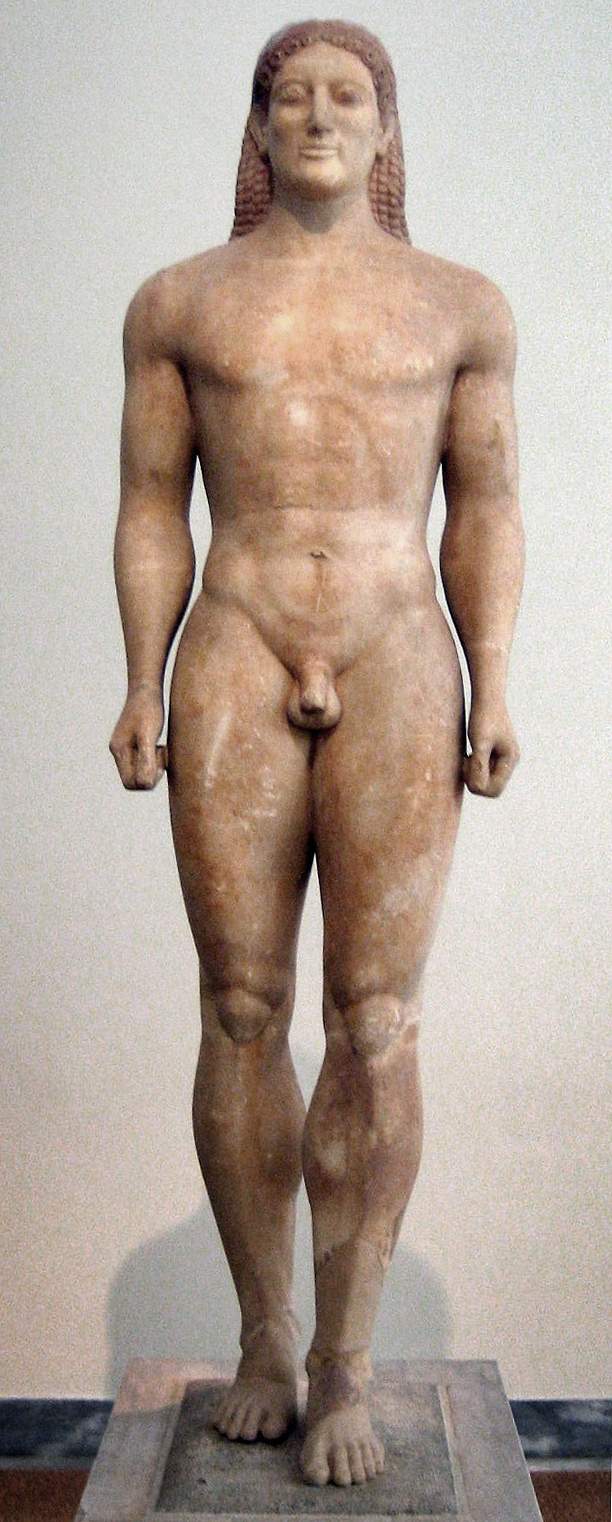
Kouros representing an idealized youth. Around 530 BCE

Since the publication in 1978 of Kenneth Dover's work Greek Homosexuality, the terms erastês and erômenos have been standard for the two pederastic roles. Both words derive from the Greek verb erô, erân, "to love"; see also eros.

In Dover's strict dichotomy, the erastês (ἐραστής, plural erastai) is the older sexual actor, seen as the active or dominant participant, with the suffix -tês (-τής) denoting agency. Erastês should be distinguished from Greek paiderastês, which meant "lover of boys" usually with a negative connotation. The Greek word paiderastia (παιδεραστία) is an abstract noun. It is formed from paiderastês, which in turn is a compound of pais ("child", plural paides) and erastês (see below). Although the word pais can refer to a child of either sex, paiderastia is defined by Liddell and Scott's Greek-English Lexicon as "the love of boys", and the verb paiderasteuein as "to be a lover of boys". The erastês himself might only be in his early twenties, and thus the age difference between the two males who engage in sexual activity might be negligible.

The word erômenos, or "beloved" (ἐρώμενος, plural eromenoi), is the masculine form of the present passive participle from erô, viewed by Dover as the passive or subordinate sexual participant. An erômenos can also be called pais, "child". The pais was regarded as a future citizen, not an "inferior object of sexual gratification", and was portrayed with respect in art. The word can be understood as an endearment such as a parent might use, found also in the poetry of Sappho and a designation of only relative age. Both art and other literary references show that the erômenos was at least a teen, with modern age estimates ranging from 13 to 20, or in some cases up to 30. Most evidence indicates eromenos was usually of an age when an aristocrat began his formal military training, that is, from fifteen to seventeen. As an indication of physical maturity, the erômenos was sometimes as tall as or taller than the older erastês, and may have his first facial hair. Another word used by the Greeks for the younger sexual participant was paidika, a neuter plural adjective ("things having to do with children") treated syntactically as masculine singular.

In poetry and philosophical literature, the erômenos is often an embodiment of idealized youth; a related ideal depiction of youth in Archaic culture was the kouros, the long-haired male statuary nude.

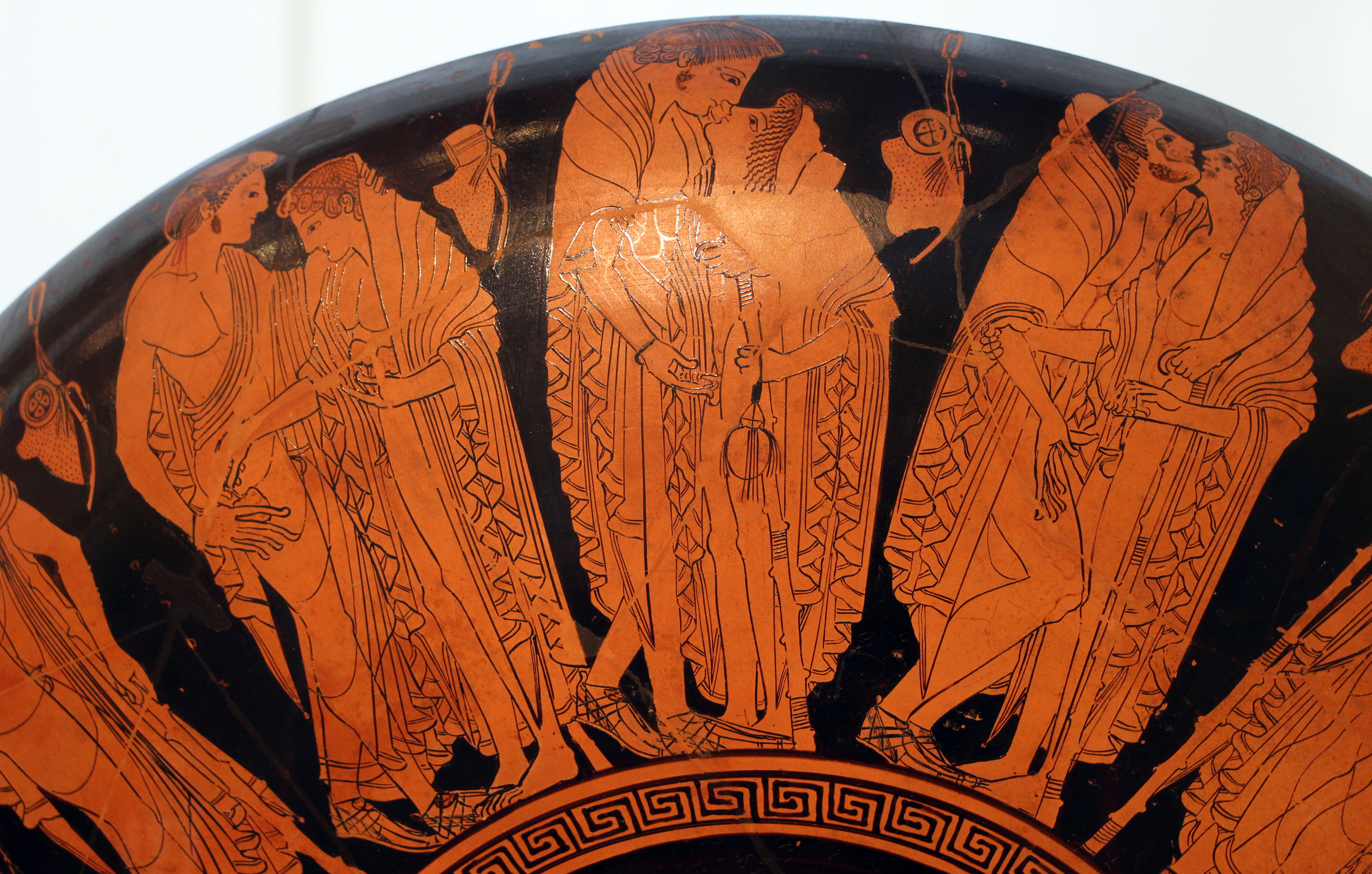
Pederastic couples. Outside of an Attic kylix. Peithinos Painter. Around 500 BCE. Altes Museum

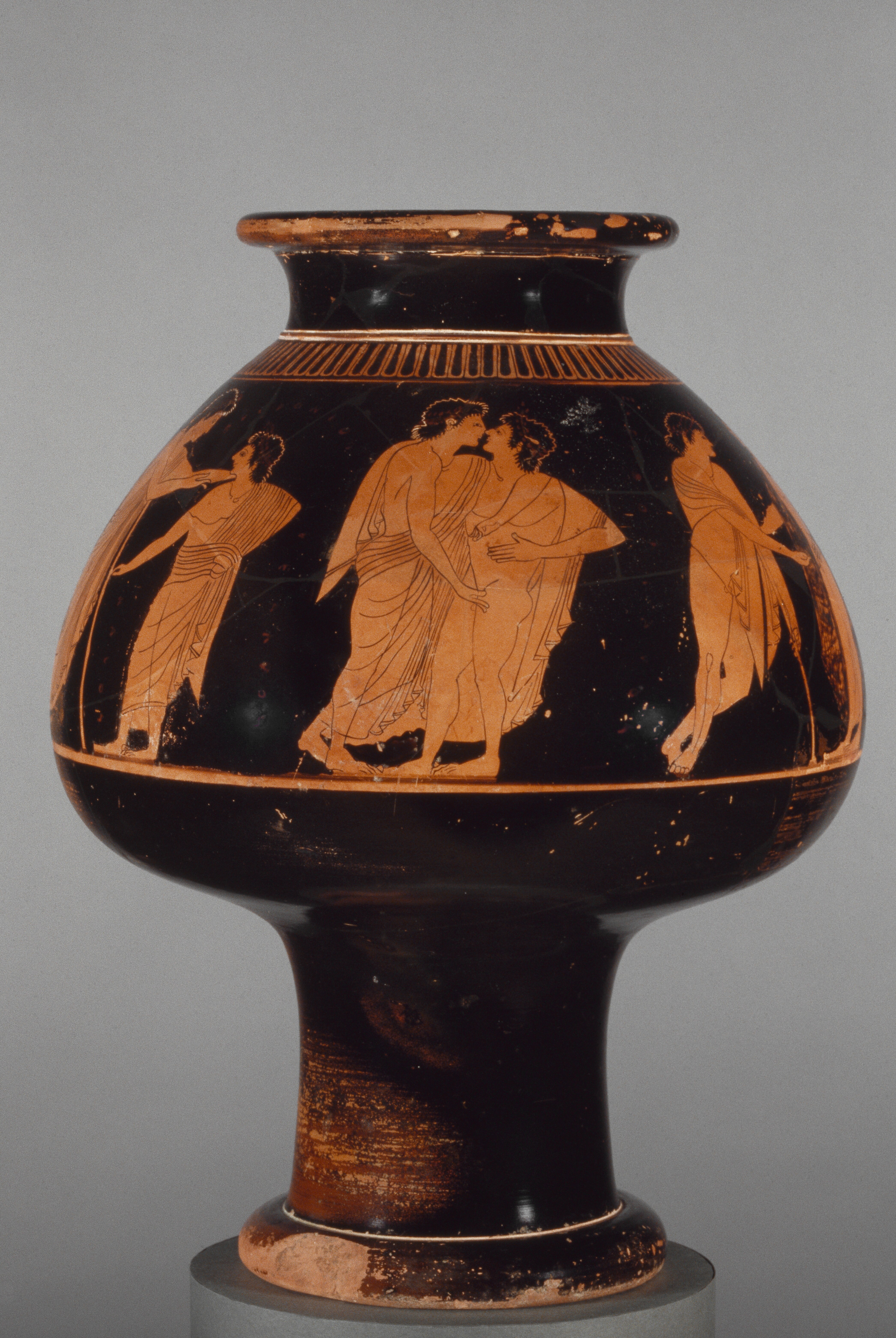
Pederastic scene between two males. Attic Psykter. Terracotta. Attributed to Smikros. Around 510 BCE

Dover insisted that the active role of the erastês and the passivity of the erômenos is a distinction "of the highest importance", but subsequent scholars have tried to present a more varied picture of the behaviors and values associated with paiderastia. Although ancient Greek writers use erastês and erômenos in a pederastic context, the words are not technical terms for social roles, and can refer to the "lover" and "beloved" in other hetero- and homosexual couples.

== Origins ==
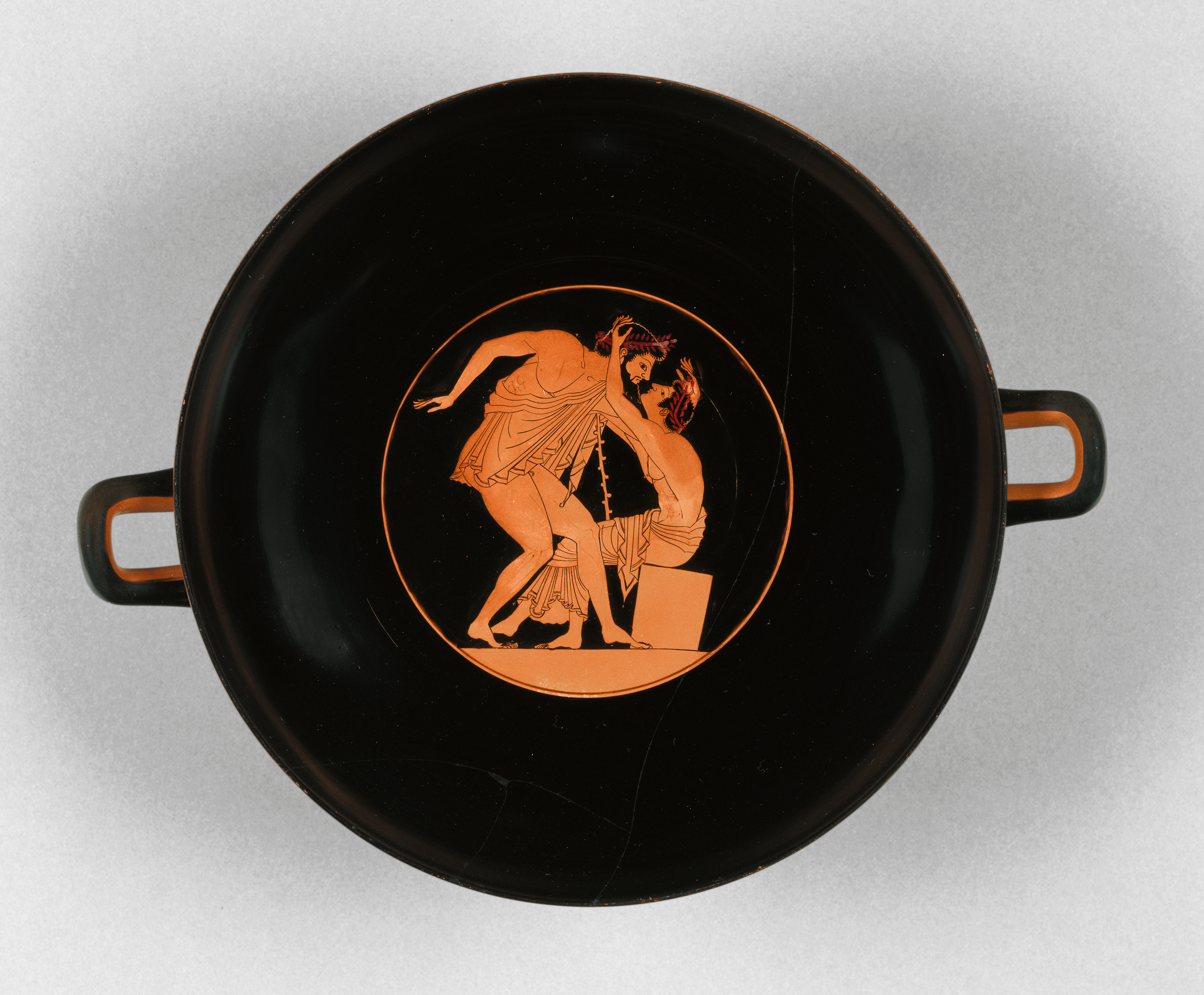
Pederastic scene. Kylix. Terracotta. Carpenter Painter. 510–500 BCE

The Greek practice of pederasty came suddenly into prominence at the end of the Archaic period of Greek history. There is a brass plaque from Crete, about 650–625 BC, which is the oldest surviving representation of pederastic custom. Such representations appear from all over Greece in the next century; literary and artistic sources show it as being established custom in many cities by the 5th century BC.

Cretan pederasty as a social institution seems to have been grounded in an initiation which involved abduction. A man (Ancient Greek: φιλήτωρ – philetor, "lover") selected a youth, enlisted the chosen one's friends to help him, and carried off the object of his affections to his andreion, a sort of men's club or meeting hall. The youth received gifts, and the philetor along with the friends went away with him for two months into the countryside, where they hunted and feasted. At the end of this time, the philetor presented the youth with three contractually required gifts: military attire, an ox, and a drinking cup. Other costly gifts followed. Upon their return to the city, the youth sacrificed the ox to Zeus, and his friends joined him at the feast. He received special clothing that in adult life marked him as kleinos, "famous, renowned". The initiate was called a parastatheis, "he who stands beside", perhaps because, like Ganymede the cup-bearer of Zeus, he stood at the side of the philetor during meals in the andreion and served him from the cup that had been ceremonially presented. In this interpretation, the formal custom reflects myth and ritual.

== Social aspects ==
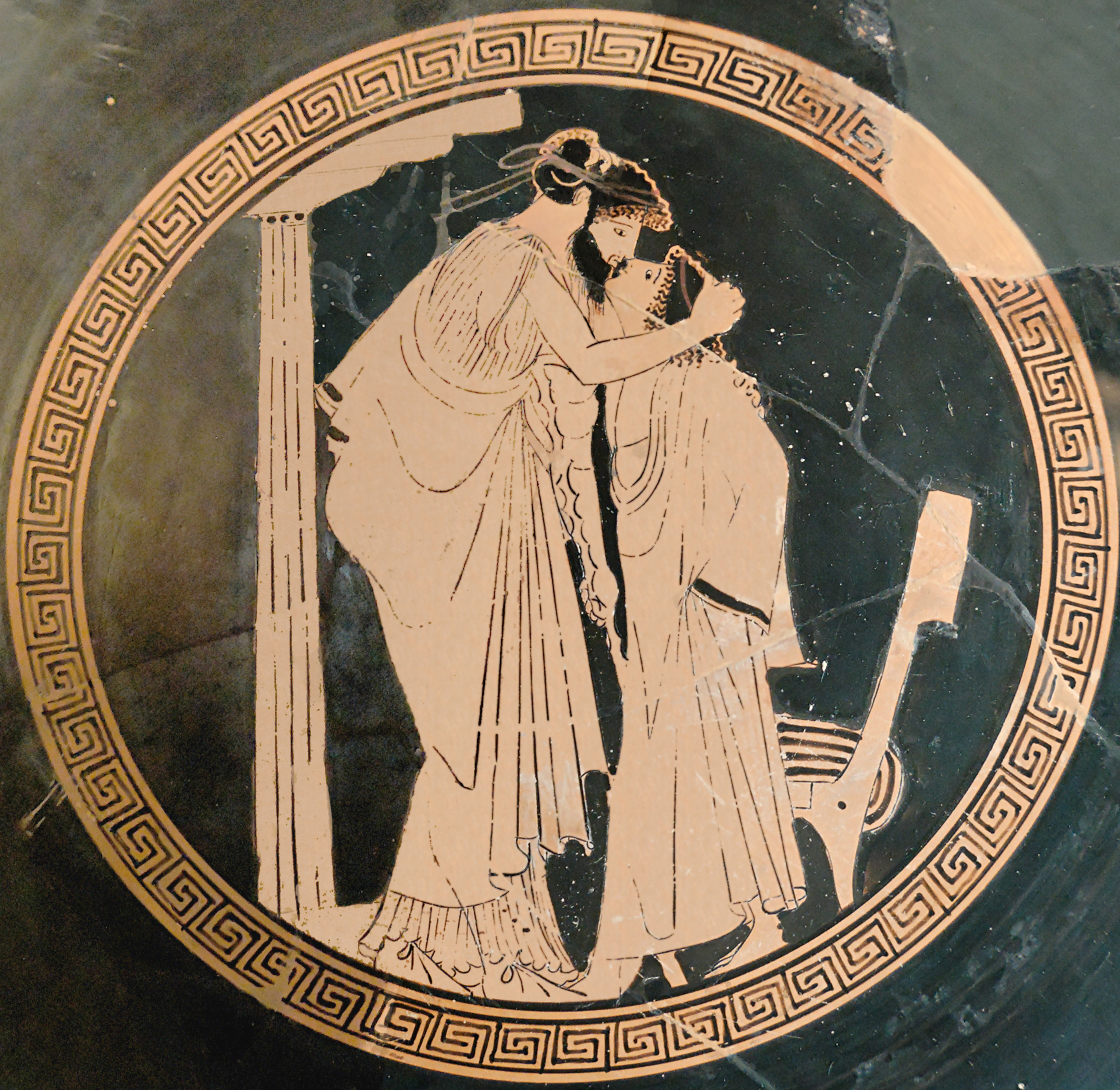
Attic kylix depicting a lover and a beloved kissing. Artist: painter of Briseis. Around 480 BCE. Louvre Museum

The erastês-erômenos relationship played a role in the Classical Greek social and educational system, had its own complex social-sexual etiquette and was an important social practice among the upper classes. Pederasty has been understood as educative, and Greek authors from Aristophanes to Pindar felt it naturally present in the context of aristocratic education (paideia). In general, pederasty as described in Greek literary sources is a practice reserved for aristocrats, perhaps to be regarded as a dyadic mentorship which sometimes could take a physical dimension.

There is a debate regarding the prevalence and acceptance of pederasty. Some scholars believes pederasty was common only among the aristocracy, and that such relationships were not widely practised by the common people (demos). One such scholar is Bruce Thornton, who argues that insults directed at pederastic males in the comedies of Aristophanes show the common people's dislike for the practice. According to Thomas K. Hubbard pederasty was not the norm, at least at Athens, and was highly problematized. Other scholars, such as Victoria Wohl, claims that in Athens, same-sex desire was part of the "sexual ideology of the democracy", shared by the elite and the demos, as exemplified by the tyrant-slayers Harmodius and Aristogeiton.

A 4th-century historian, Euphor, claims that in Crete, in order for the suitor to carry out the ritual abduction, the father had to approve him as worthy of the honor. Among the Athenians, to protect their sons from inappropriate attempts at seduction, fathers appointed slaves called pedagogues to watch over their sons. However, according to Aeschines, Athenian fathers would pray that their sons would be handsome and attractive, with the full knowledge that they would then attract the attention of men and "be the objects of fights because of erotic passions".

The age range when boys entered into such relationships was consonant with that of Greek girls given in marriage, often to adult husbands many years their senior. Boys, however, usually had to be courted and were free to choose their mate, while marriages for girls were arranged for economic and political advantage at the discretion of father and suitor. Typically, after their relationship had ended and the young man had married, the older man and his protégé would remain on close terms throughout their life. Not all pederastic relationships were sexual—many were simply forms of friendship and guidance.

In parts of Greece, pederasty was an acceptable form of homoeroticism that had other, less socially accepted manifestations, such as the sexual use of slaves or being a pornos (prostitute) or hetairos (the male equivalent of a hetaira). Scholars like Dover makes the claim that visiting prostitutes of either sex was considered completely acceptable for a male citizen. However, adolescent citizens of free status who prostituted themselves were sometimes ridiculed, and were permanently prohibited by Attic law from performing some seven official functions (Note: The seven functions that a free Athenian citizen who had prostituted himself was prohibited from performing: Becoming one of the nine archons—because the myrtle wreath was worn as sign of the sacred character of that office; Carrying out a priestly function—because a prostitute was not considered "clean in body"; Acting as an advocate in the state's interest; Holding any office whatsoever at any time, in Attica or abroad, whether filled by lot or by election; Serving as a herald; Serving as an ambassador; Addressing the senate or assembly) because it was believed that since they had sold their own body "for the pleasure of others" (ἐφ' ὕβρει, eph' hybrei), they would not hesitate to sell the interests of the community as a whole. If they, or an adult citizen of free status who had prostituted himself, performed any of the official functions prohibited to them by law (in later life), they were liable to prosecution and punishment. However, if they did not perform those specific functions, did not present themselves for the allocation of those functions and declared themselves ineligible if they were somehow mistakenly elected to perform those specific functions, they were safe from prosecution and punishment. Non-citizens visiting or residing in a city-state could not perform official functions in any case whatsoever, thus could prostitute themselves without penalty.

=== Political expression ===
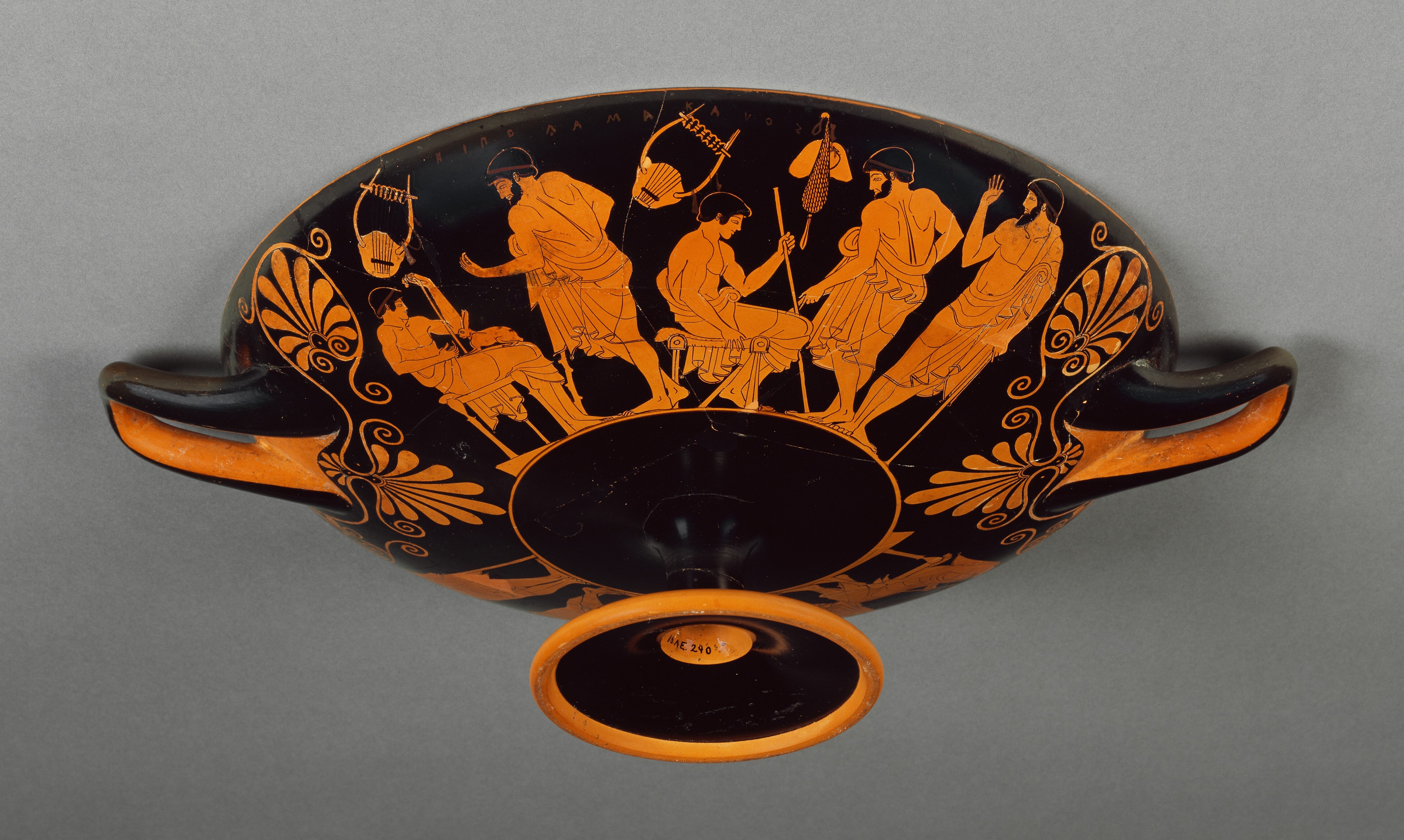
Pederastic courtship scenes. It has been commented that "Hares were popular love gifts in Athenian society ... [and] ... a hare can be seen siting tamely on the lap of one of the seated figures." The outside of an Attic cup. Kylix. Artist; Douris. Potter; Attributed to the Python potter. Around 480 BCE. J. Paul Getty Museum

In his speech "Against Timarchus" in 346 BC, the Athenian politician Aeschines argues against further allowing Timarchus, an experienced middle-aged politician, certain political rights, as Attic law prohibited anyone who had prostituted himself from exercising those rights and Timarchus was known to have spent his adolescence as the sexual partner of a series of wealthy men in order to obtain money. Such a law existed because it was believed that anyone who had sold their own body would not hesitate to sell the interests of the city-state. Aeschines won his case, and Timarchus was sentenced to atimia (disenfranchisement and civic disempowerment).

By contrast, as expressed in Pausanias' speech in Plato's Symposium, pederastic love was said to be favorable to democracy and feared by tyrants, because the bond between the erastês and erômenos was stronger than that of obedience to a despotic ruler. Athenaeus states that "Hieronymus the Aristotelian says that love with boys was fashionable because several tyrannies had been overturned by young men in their prime, joined together as comrades in mutual sympathy". He gives as examples of such pederastic couples the Athenians Harmodius and Aristogeiton, who were credited (perhaps symbolically) with the overthrow of the tyrant Hippias and the establishment of democracy, and also Chariton and Melanippus. Others, such as Aristotle, claimed that the Cretan lawgivers encouraged pederasty as a means of population control, by directing love and sexual desire into non-procreative channels:

and the lawgiver has devised many wise measures to secure the benefit of moderation at table, and the segregation of the women in order that they may not bear many children, for which purpose he instituted association with the male sex.

=== Philosophical expression ===
The speaker Socrates in the Platonic dialogues and Xenophonic dialogues presents a chaste, non sexual pederastic relationship as the ideal. According to Dover, Both Xenophon and Plato presents Socrates as against homosexual copulation and instead advocated platonic relationships.

In Laws, Plato takes a much more austere stance to homosexuality than in previous works, stating:

... one certainly should not fail to observe that when male unites with female for procreation the pleasure experienced is held to be due to nature, but contrary to nature when male mates with male or female with female, and that those first guilty of such enormities [the Cretans] were impelled by their slavery to pleasure. And we all accuse the Cretans of concocting the story about Ganymede.

Plato states here that "we all", possibly referring to society as a whole or simply his social group, believe the story of Ganymede's homosexuality to have been fabricated by the Cretans to justify immoral behaviours. The Athenian stranger in Plato's Laws blames pederasty for promoting civil strife and driving many to their wits' end, and recommends the prohibition of sexual intercourse with youths, laying out a path whereby this may be accomplished.

=== In myth and religion ===
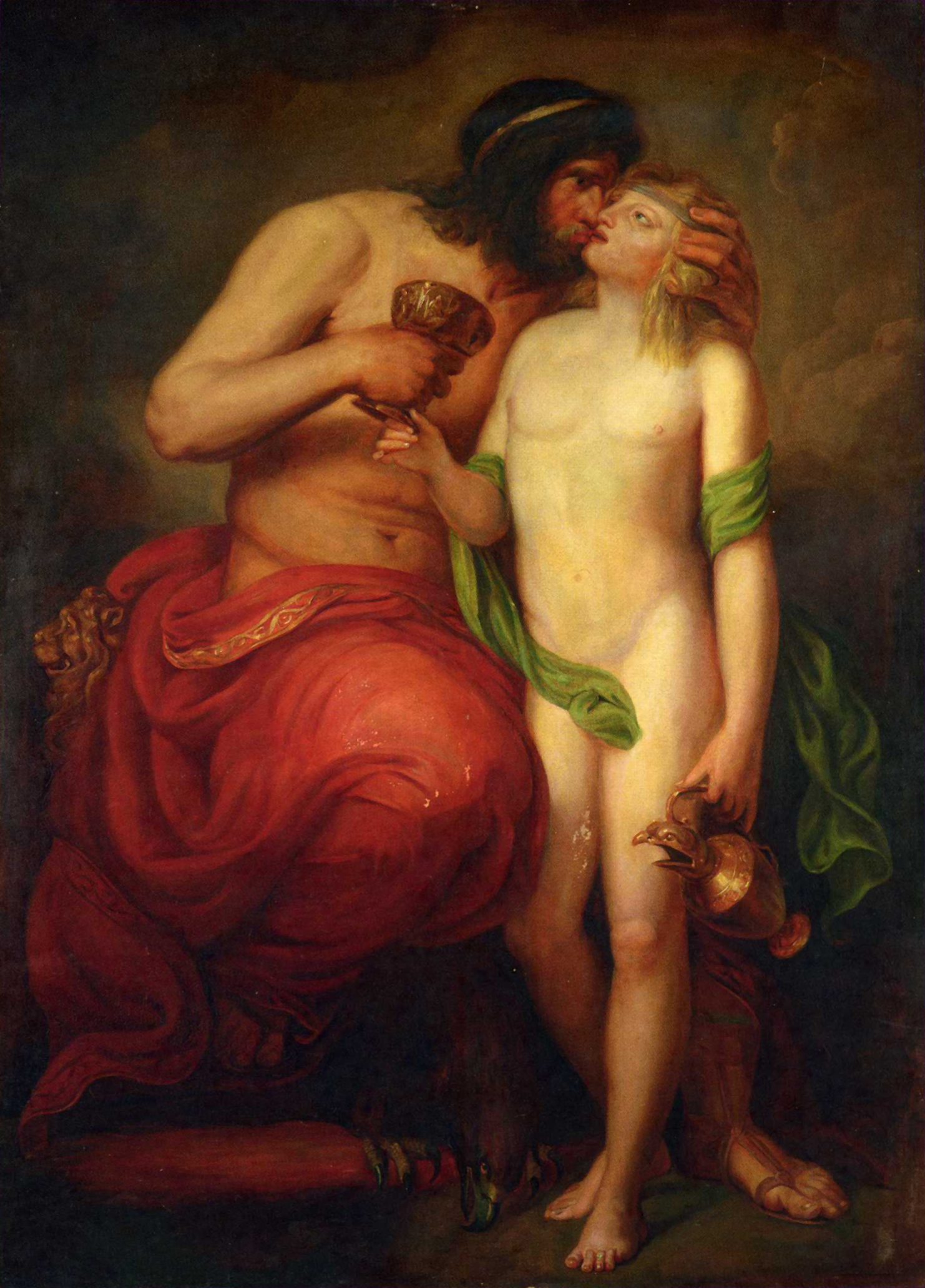
Zeus kissing Ganymede. A copy of an original by Wilhelm Böttner. Originally painted circa 1780. This copy was painted in the 19th century.

The myth of Ganymede's abduction by Zeus was invoked as a precedent for the pederastic relationship, as Theognis asserts to a friend:

There is some pleasure in loving a boy (paidophilein), since once in fact even the son of Cronus [that is, Zeus], king of immortals, fell in love with Ganymede, seized him, carried him off to Olympus, and made him divine, keeping the lovely bloom of boyhood (paideia). So, don't be astonished, Simonides, that I too have been revealed as captivated by love for a handsome boy.

The myth of Ganymede's abduction, however, was not taken seriously by some in Athenian society, and deemed to be a Cretan fabrication designed to justify homoeroticism.

The 5th century BC poet Pindar constructed the story of a sexual pederastic relationship between Poseidon and Pelops, intended to replace an earlier story of cannibalism that Pindar deemed an unsavoury representation of the Gods. The story tells of Poseidon's love for a mortal boy, Pelops, who wins a chariot race with help from his admirer Poseidon.

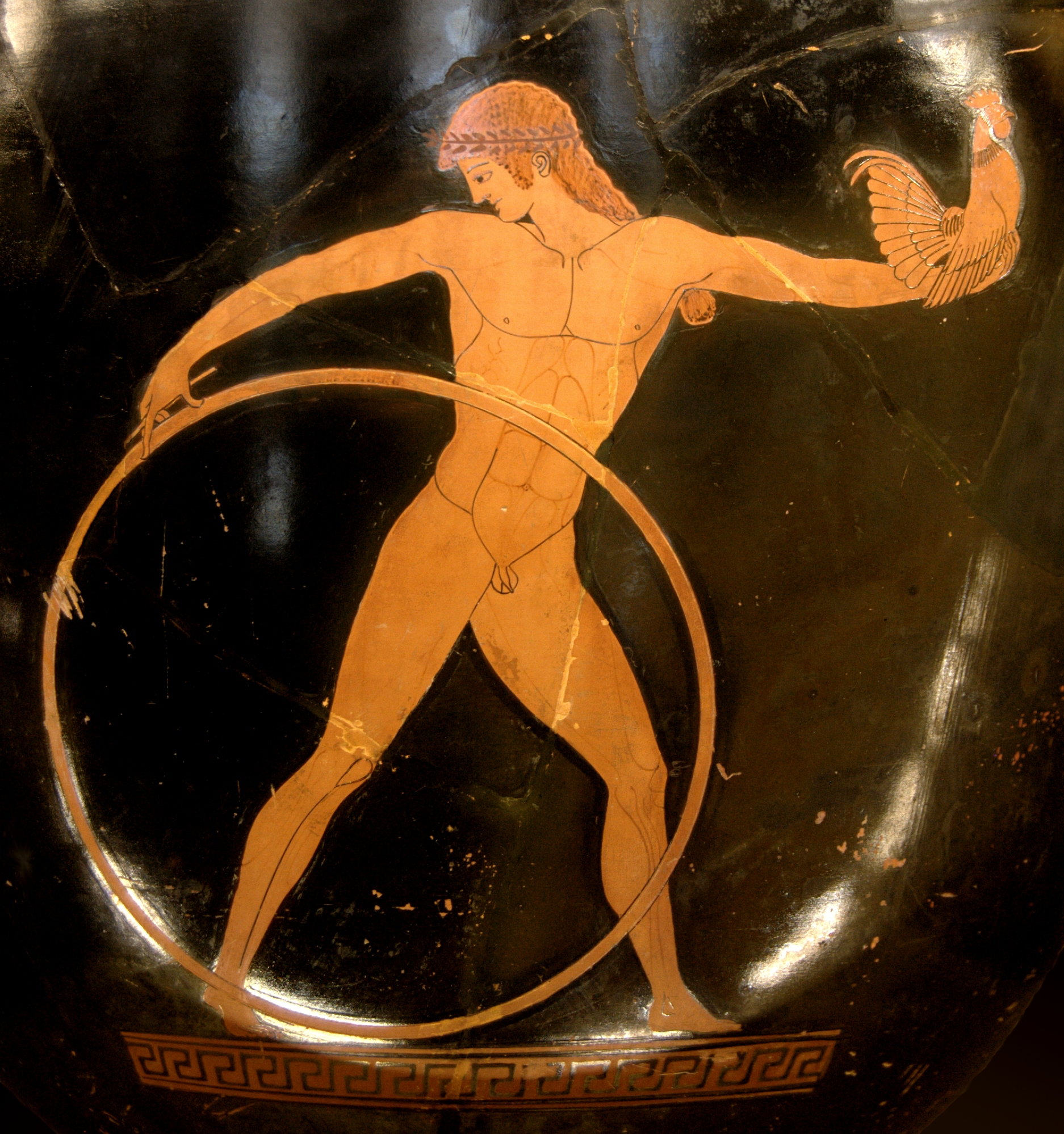
Ganymede rolling a hoop and carrying a cockerel, a love gift from Zeus who is depicted in pursuit on the other side of this Attic krater. Around 500 BCE

Though examples of such a custom exist in earlier Greek works, myths providing examples of young men who were the lovers of gods began to emerge in Classical literature, around the 6th century BC. In these later tales, pederastic love is ascribed to Zeus (with Ganymede), Poseidon (with Pelops), Apollo (with Cyparissus, Hyacinthus and Admetus), Orpheus, Heracles, Dionysus, Hermes, and Pan. All the Olympian gods except Ares are purported to have had these relationships, which some scholars argue demonstrates that the specific customs of paiderastia originated in initiatory rituals.

Myths attributed to the homosexuality of Dionysus are very late and often post-pagan additions. The tale of Dionysus and Ampelos was written by the Egyptian poet Nonnus sometime between the 4th and 5th centuries CE, making it unreliable. Likewise, the tale of Dionysus and Prosymnus, which tells that the former anally masturbated with a fig branch over the latter's grave, was written by Christians, whose aim was to discredit pagan mythology.

Dover, however, believed that these myths are only literary versions expressing or explaining the "overt" homosexuality of Greek Archaic culture, the distinctiveness of which he contrasted to attitudes in other ancient societies such as Egypt and Israel.

=== Creative expression ===
==== Visual arts ====
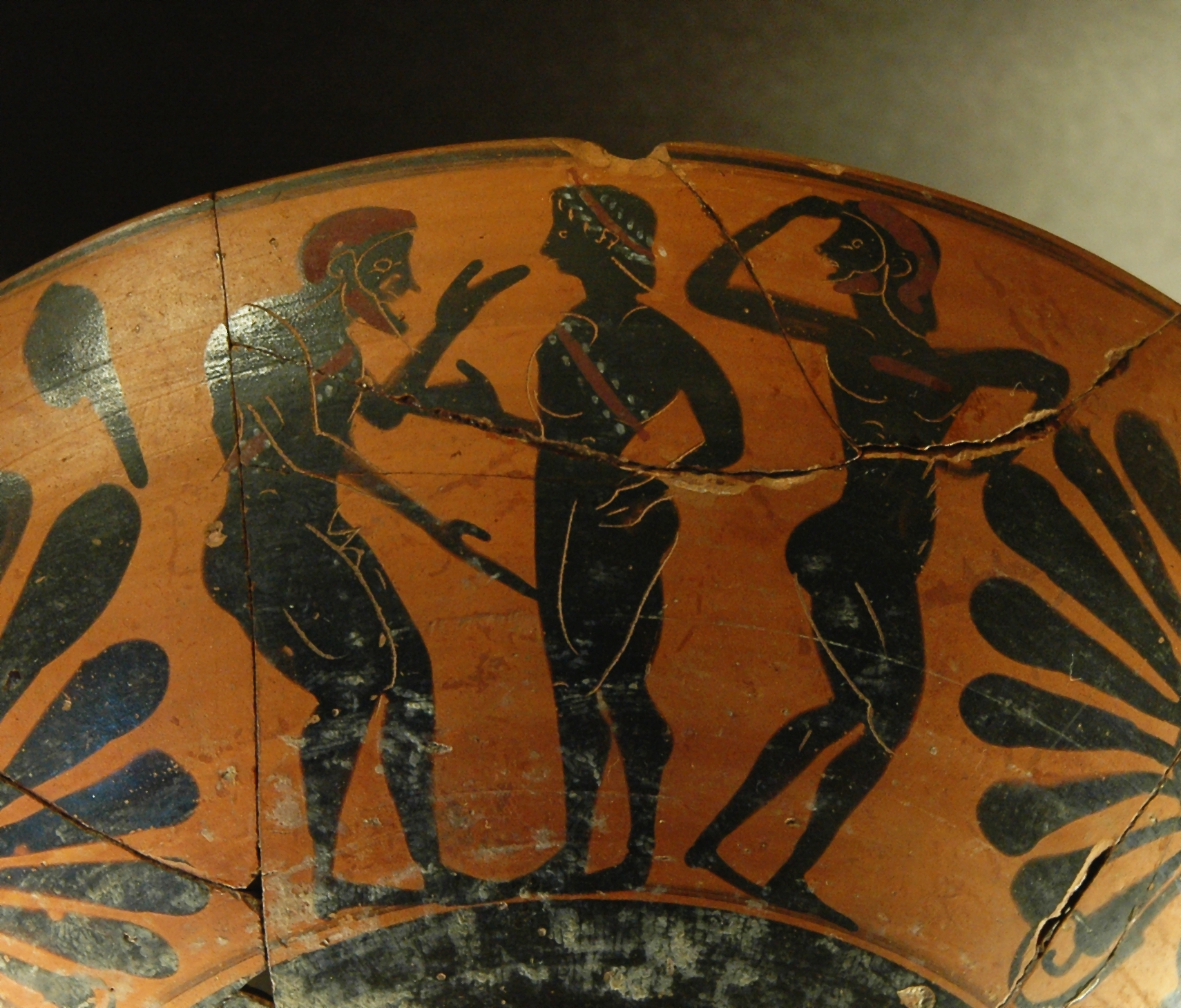
Pederastic scene on an Attic Lekythos. 530–520 BCE

Greek vase painting is a major source for scholars seeking to understand attitudes and practices associated with paiderastia. Hundreds of pederastic scenes are depicted on Attic black-figure vases. In the early 20th century, John Beazley classified pederastic vases into three types:

- The erastês and erômenos stand facing each other; the erastês, knees bent, reaches with one hand for the beloved's chin and with the other for his genitals.
- The erastês presents the erômenos with a small gift, sometimes an animal.
- The standing lovers engage in intercrural sex.

Certain gifts traditionally given by the erômenos became symbols that contributed to interpreting a given scene as pederastic. Animal gifts—most commonly hares and roosters, but also deer and felines—point toward hunting as an aristocratic pastime and as a metaphor for sexual pursuit. These animal gifts were commonly given to boys, whereas women often received money as a gift for sex. This difference in gifts furthered the closeness of pederastic relations. Women received money as a product of the sexual exchange and boys were given culturally significant gifts. Gifts given to boys are commonly depicted in ancient Greek art, but money given to women for sex is not.

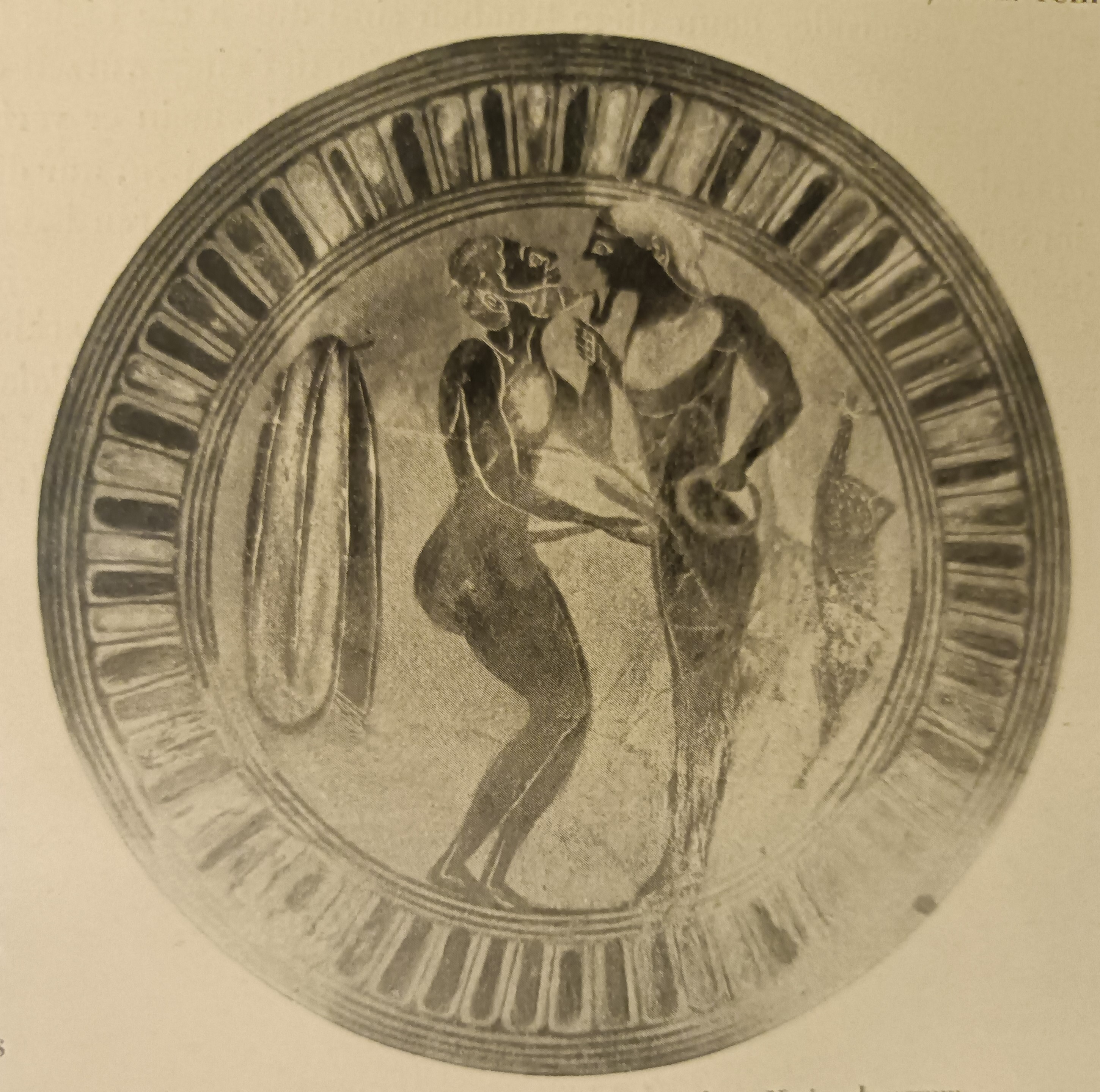
A pederastic scene with two figures that both have erections. Bowl. Ancient Greek. Athens National museum

The explicit nature of some images has led in particular to discussions of whether the erômenos took active pleasure in the sex act. In most images of pederastic scenes the youthful beloved is pictured without an erection; his penis "remains flaccid even in circumstances to which one would expect the penis of any healthy adolescent to respond willy-nilly". One painting on a bowl from the Athens National Museum shows a pederastic scene where both of the figures have erect penises.

Fondling the youth's genitals was one of the most common images of pederastic courtship on vases, a gesture indicated also in Aristophanes' comedy Birds (line 142). Some vases do show the younger partner as sexually responsive, prompting one scholar to wonder, "What can the point of this act have been unless lovers in fact derived some pleasure from feeling and watching the boy's developing organ wake up and respond to their manual stimulation?"

Chronological study of the vase paintings reveals a changing aesthetic in the depiction of the erômenos. In the 6th century BC, he is a young beardless man with long hair, of adult height and physique, usually nude. As the 5th century begins, he has become smaller and slighter, "barely pubescent", and often draped as a girl would be. No inferences about social customs should be based on this element of the courtship scene alone.

==== Poetry ====
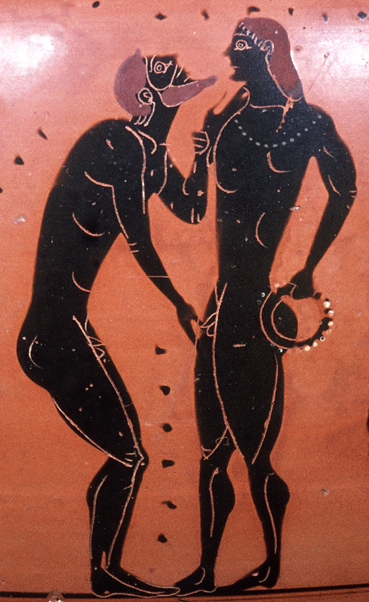
Bearded man in a traditional pederastic courtship scene showing the "up-and-down" gesture: one hand reaches to fondle the young man, the other grasps his chin so as to look him in the eye. Athenian amphora, c. 540 BCE

There are many pederastic references among the works of the Megaran poet Theognis addressed to Cyrnus (Greek Kyrnos). Some portions of the Theognidean corpus are probably not by the individual from Megara, but rather represent "several generations of wisdom poetry". The poems are "social, political, or ethical precepts transmitted to Cyrnus as part of his formation into an adult Megarian aristocrat in Theognis' own image".

The relationship between Theognis and Kyrnos eludes categorization. Although it was assumed in antiquity that Kyrnos was the poet's erômenos, the poems that are most explicitly erotic are not addressed to him—the poetry on "the joys and sorrows" of pederasty seem more apt for sharing with a fellow erastês, perhaps in the setting of the symposium—"the relationship, in any case, is left vague".

In general, Theognis (and the tradition that appears under his name) treats the pederastic relationship as heavily pedagogical. Theocritus, a Hellenistic poet, describes a kissing contest for youths that took place at the tomb of a certain Diocles of Megara, a warrior renowned for his love of boys; he notes that invoking Ganymede was proper to the occasion.

== Sexual practices ==
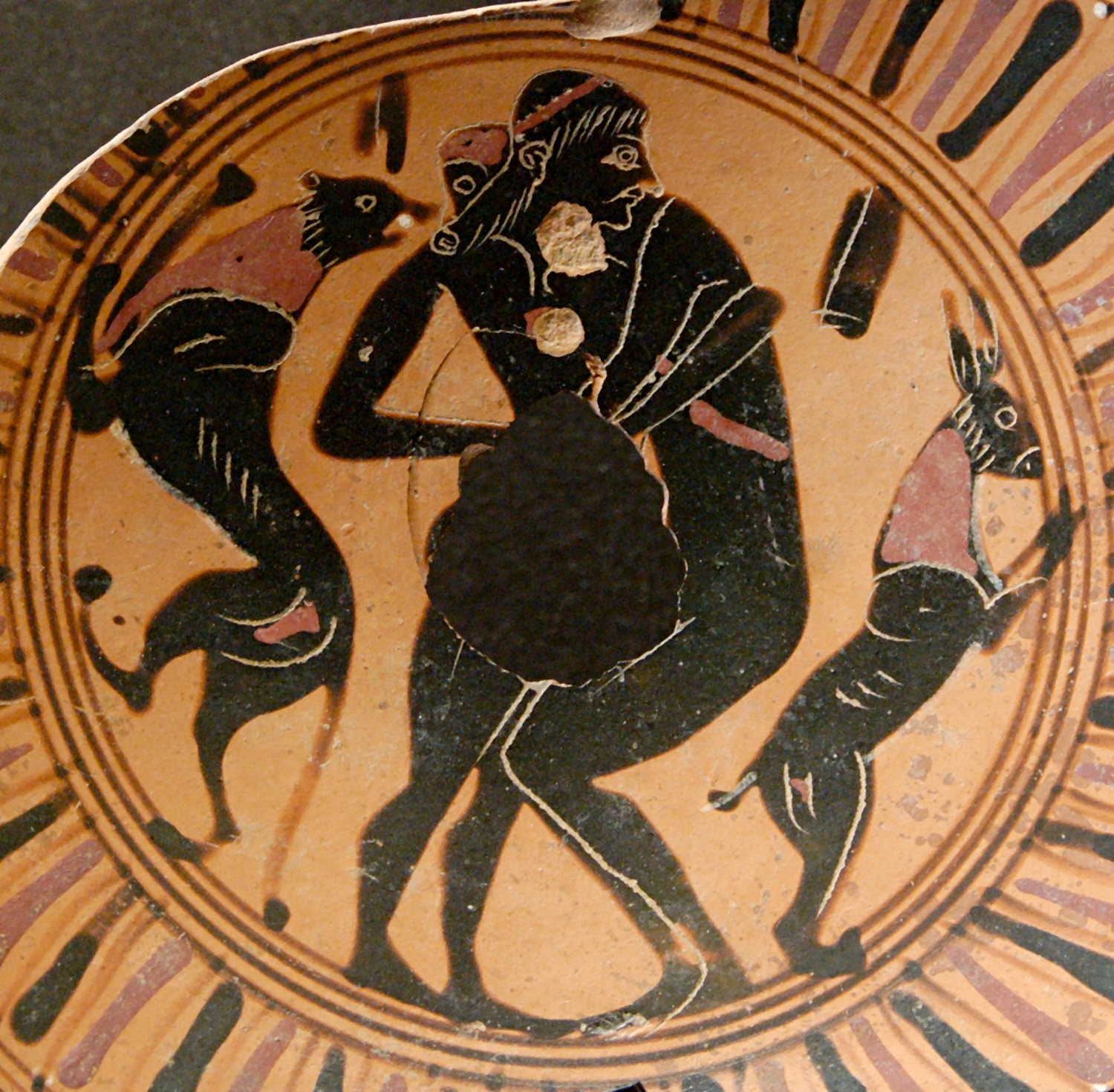
Pederastic intercrural sex. Attic cup. 550–525 BCE

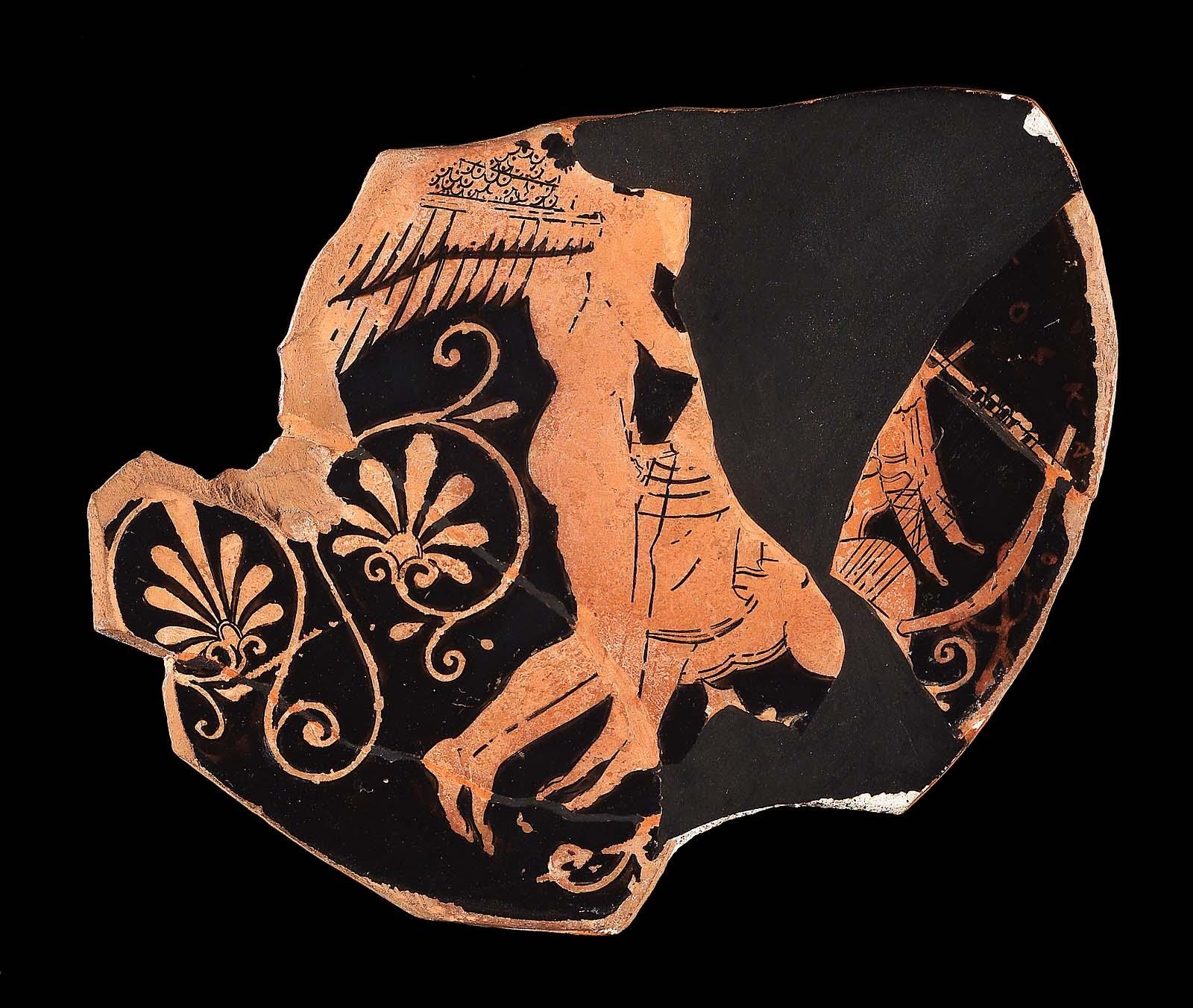
Intercrural sex between a winged Eros and a boy. 490–480 BCE

Vase paintings and references to the erômenos's thighs in poetry indicate that when the pederastic couple engaged in sex acts, the preferred form was intercrural.

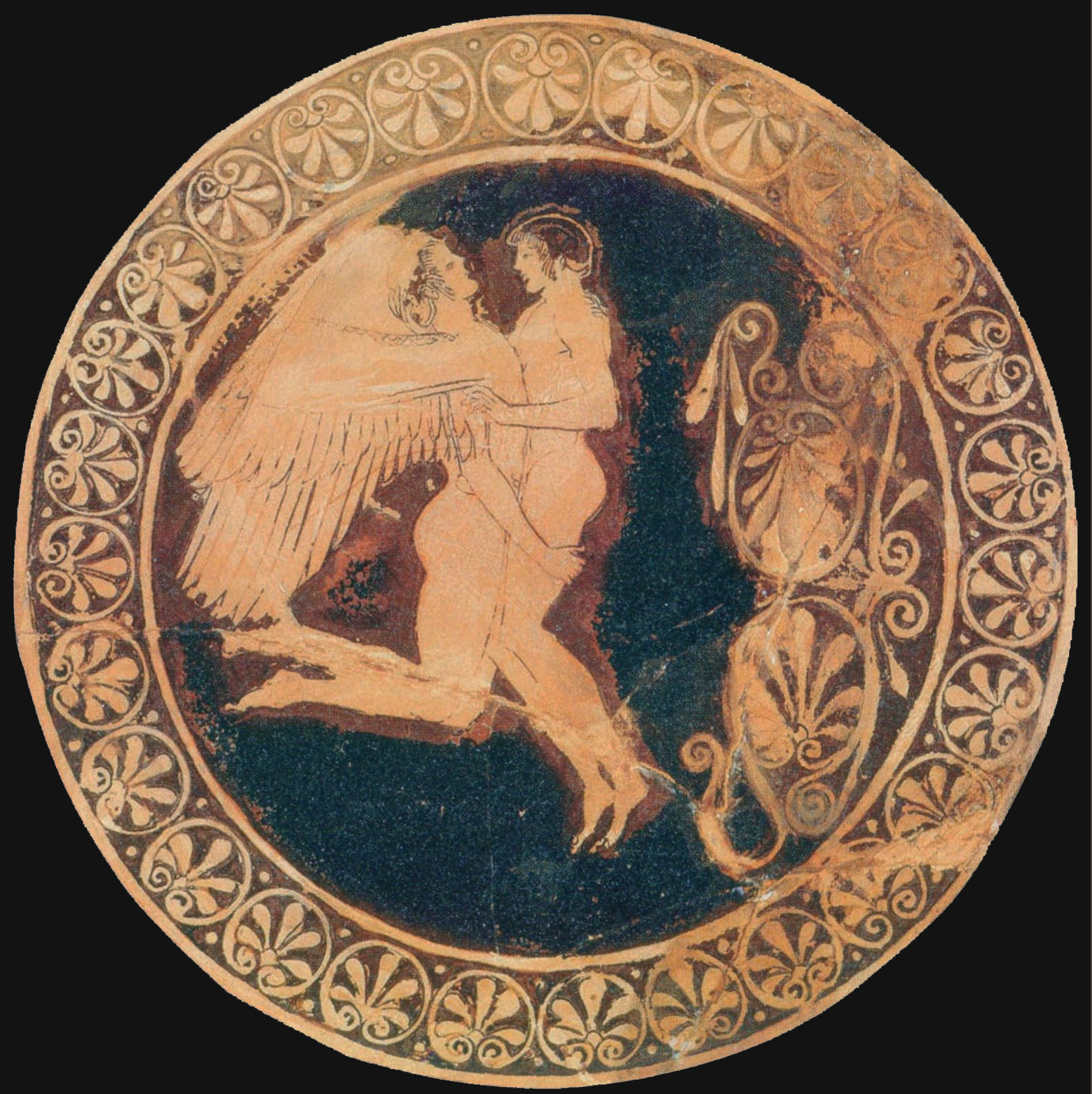
Zephyrus and Hyacinthus. The latter was a patron hero of pederasty in Greece.Attic red-figure cup from Tarquinia, c. 490 BC Museum of Fine Arts, Boston

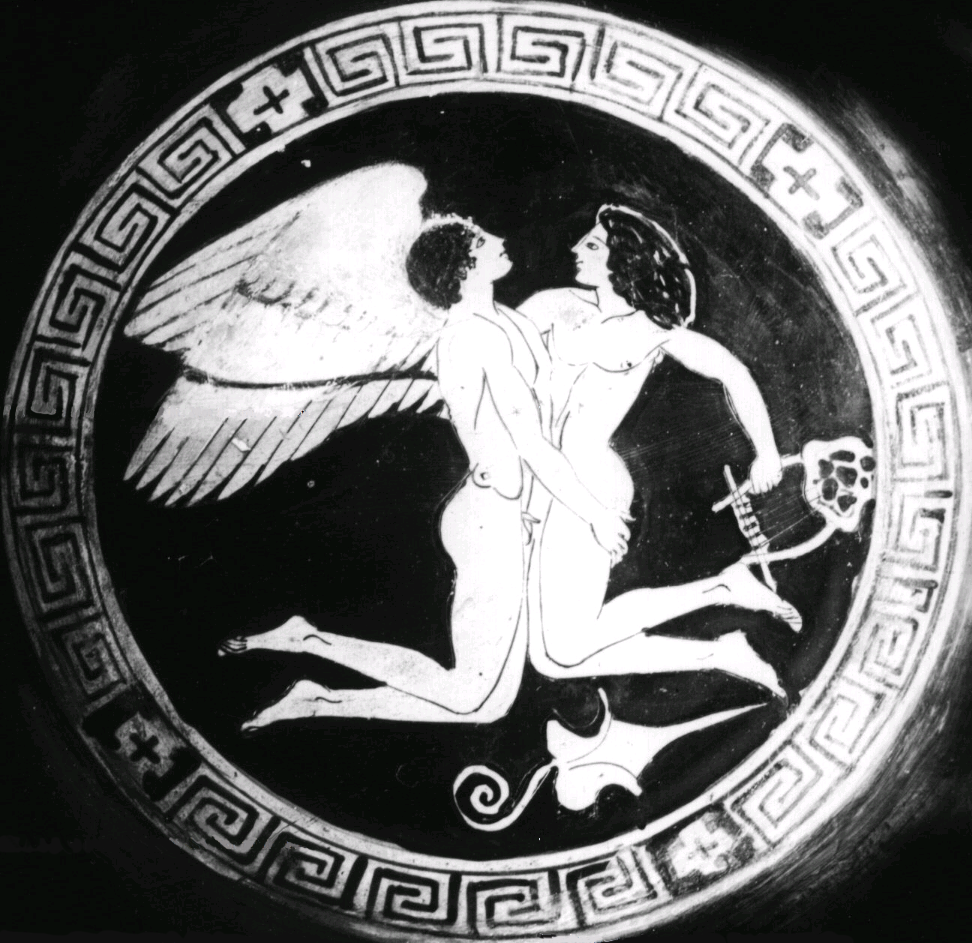
Hyacinthus and Zephyrus. Attic Red Figure Kylix. Attributed to Manner of Douris Painter. 500–450 B.C.

Some vase paintings, which historian William Percy considers a fourth type of pederastic scene in addition to Beazley's three, show the erastês seated with an erection and the erômenos either approaching or climbing into his lap. The composition of these scenes is the same as that for depictions of women mounting men who are seated and aroused for intercourse. According to the thesis presented by Kenneth Dover in 1979, as a cultural norm, considered apart from personal preference, anal penetration was most often seen as dishonorable to the one penetrated, or shameful, because of "its potential appearance of being turned into a woman" and because it was feared that it may distract the erômenos from playing the active, penetrative role later in life. A fable attributed to Aesop tells how Aeschyne (Shame) consented to enter the human body from behind only as long as Eros did not follow the same path, and would fly away at once if he did. A man who acted as the receiver during anal intercourse may have been the recipient of the insult "kinaidos", meaning effeminate. No shame was associated with intercrural penetration or any other act that did not involve anal penetration. This interpretation is largely based on the thesis of Kenneth Dover. Oral sex is likewise not depicted, or directly suggested; anal and oral penetration seem to have been reserved for prostitutes or slaves.

Dover maintained that the erômenos was ideally not supposed to feel "unmanly" desire for the erastês. Nussbaum argues that the depiction of the erômenos as deriving no sexual pleasure from sex with the erastês "may well be a cultural norm that conceals a more complicated reality", as the erômenos is known to have frequently felt intense affection for his erastês and there is evidence that he experienced sexual arousal with him as well. In Plato's Phaedrus, it is related that, with time, the erômenos develops a "passionate longing" for his erastês and a "reciprocal love" (anteros) for him that is a replica of the erastês’ love. The erômenos is also said to have a desire "similar to the erastes', albeit weaker, to see, to touch, to kiss and to lie with him".

== Regional characteristics ==
=== Athens ===
Many of the practices described above concern Athens, while Attic pottery is a major source for modern scholars attempting to understand the institution of pederasty. In Athens, as elsewhere, pederastia appears to have been characteristic of the aristocracy. The age of youth depicted has been estimated variously from 12 to 18.

During the period of democracy in Athens, the practice of pederasty was subjected to scrutiny and was received with lesser acceptance as it was associated with aristocracy and outmoded thinking. According to Jennifer Larson, "Aristophanes' satirical description of the proclivities of Marathon veterans, penned nearly seventy years after the famous battle, suggests that jokes satirizing the old-fashioned brand of pederasty were well received by Athenian audiences, and most references to pederasty in his comedies are negative". Among elite men, having been an eromenos created a political liability, for such men could be easily accused of having prostituted themselves.

=== The Greek East ===
Unlike the Dorians, where an older male would usually have only one erômenos (younger boy), in the east a man might have several erômenoi over the course of his life. Poems of Alcaeus indicate that the older male would customarily invite his erômenos to dine with him.

=== Crete ===
Greek pederasty was seemingly already institutionalized in Crete at the time of Thaletas, which included a "Dance of Naked Youths". It has been suggested both Crete and Sparta influenced Athenian pederasty.

=== Sparta ===
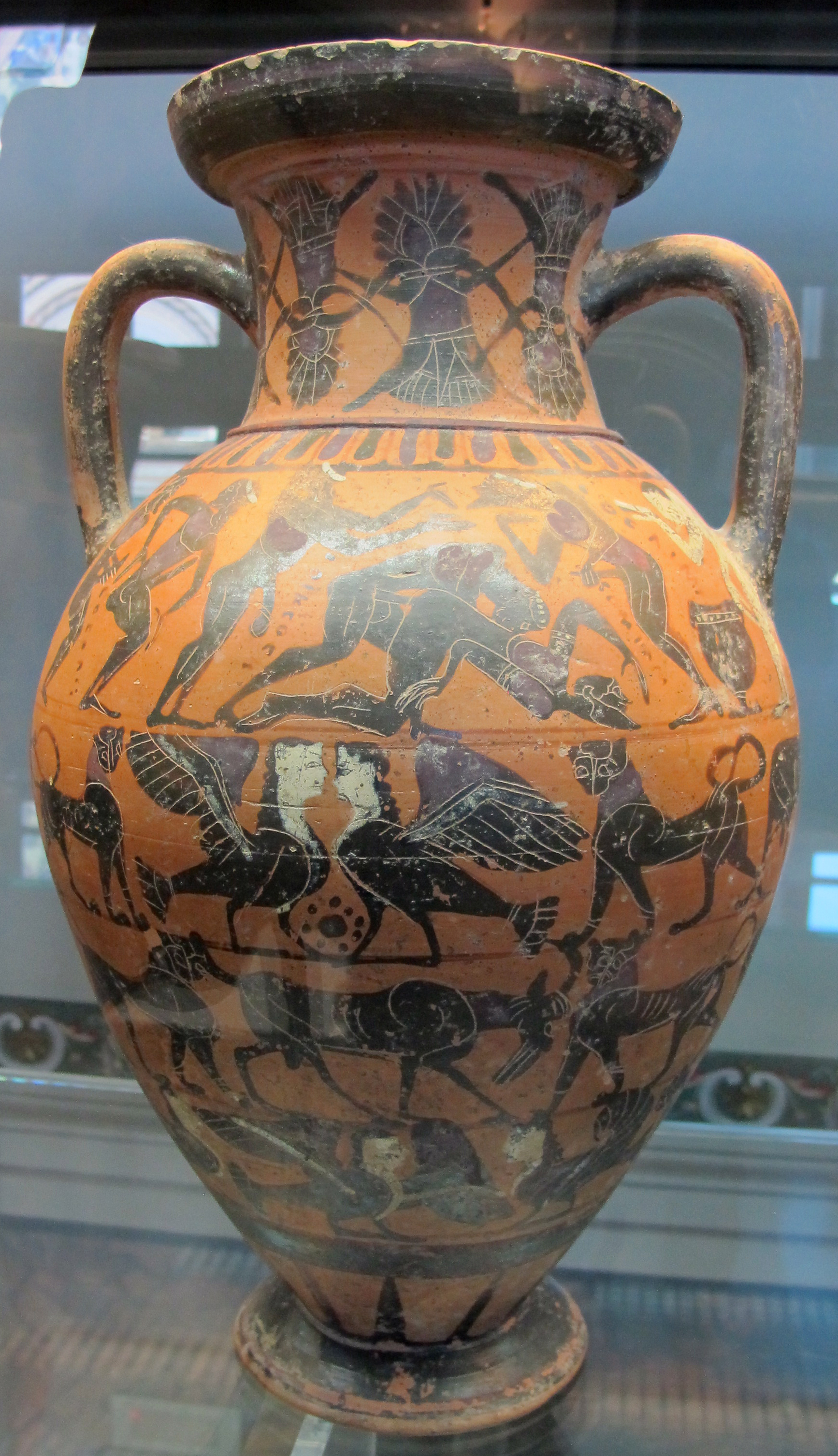
At the centre of the image is anal sex between two males. At the far left is a pederastic scene between two males. Tyrrhenian amphora. Around 565–550 BCE. Museo Civico, Orvieto

The nature of Spartan pederasty is in dispute among ancient sources and modern historians. Some think Spartan views on pederasty and homoeroticism were more chaste than those of other parts of Greece, while others find no significant difference between them.

According to Xenophon, a relationship ("association") between a man and a boy could be tolerated, but only if it was based around friendship and love and not solely around physical, sexual attraction, in which case it was considered "an abomination" tantamount to incest. Cicero states that Spartan pederasty were chaste and non-sexual. Conversely, Plutarch states that, when Spartan boys reached puberty, they are paired with older men. Aelian talks about the responsibilities of an older Spartan citizen to younger less experienced males.

Historian Thomas F. Scanlon argues Sparta, during its Dorian polis time, was the first city to practice athletic nudity, and one of the first to formalize pederasty. Sparta also imported Thaletas' songs from Crete.

In Sparta, the erastês was regarded as a guardian of the erômenos and was held responsible for any wrongdoings of the latter. Researchers of the Spartan civilization, such as Paul Cartledge, remain uncertain about the sexual aspect of the institution. Cartledge underscores that the terms "εισπνήλας" ("eispnílas") and "αΐτας" ("aḯtas") have a moralistic and pedagogic content, indicating a relationship with a paternalistic character, but argues that sexual relations were possible in some or most cases. The nature of these possible sexual relations remains, however, disputed and lost to history.

=== Megara ===
Megara cultivated good relations with Sparta, and may have been culturally attracted to emulate Spartan practices in the 7th century, when pederasty is postulated to have first been formalized in Dorian cities. One of the first cities after Sparta to be associated with the custom of athletic nudity, Megara was home to the runner Orsippus who was famed as the first to run the footrace naked at the Olympic Games and "first of all Greeks to be crowned victor naked". In one poem, the Megaran poet Theognis saw athletic nudity as a prelude to pederasty, writing, "Happy is the lover who works out naked / And then goes home to sleep all day with a beautiful boy."

=== Boeotia ===
The legislator Philolaus of Corinth, lover of the stadion race winner Diocles of Corinth at the Ancient Olympic Games of 728 BC, crafted laws for the Thebans in the 8th century BC that gave special support to male unions, contributing to the development of Theban pederasty in which, unlike other places in ancient Greece, it favored the continuity of the union of male couples even after the younger man reached adulthood, as was the case with him and Diocles, who lived together in Thebes until the end of their lives.

According to Plutarch, Theban pederasty was instituted as an educational device for boys in order to "soften, while they were young, their natural fierceness", and to "temper the manners and characters of the youth". According to tradition, the Sacred Band of Thebes comprised pederastic couples.

Boeotian pottery, in contrast to that of Athens, does not exhibit the three types of pederastic scenes identified by Beazley. The limited survival and cataloguing of pottery that can be proven to have been made in Boeotia diminishes the value of this evidence in distinguishing a specifically local tradition of paiderastia.

== Modern scholarship ==
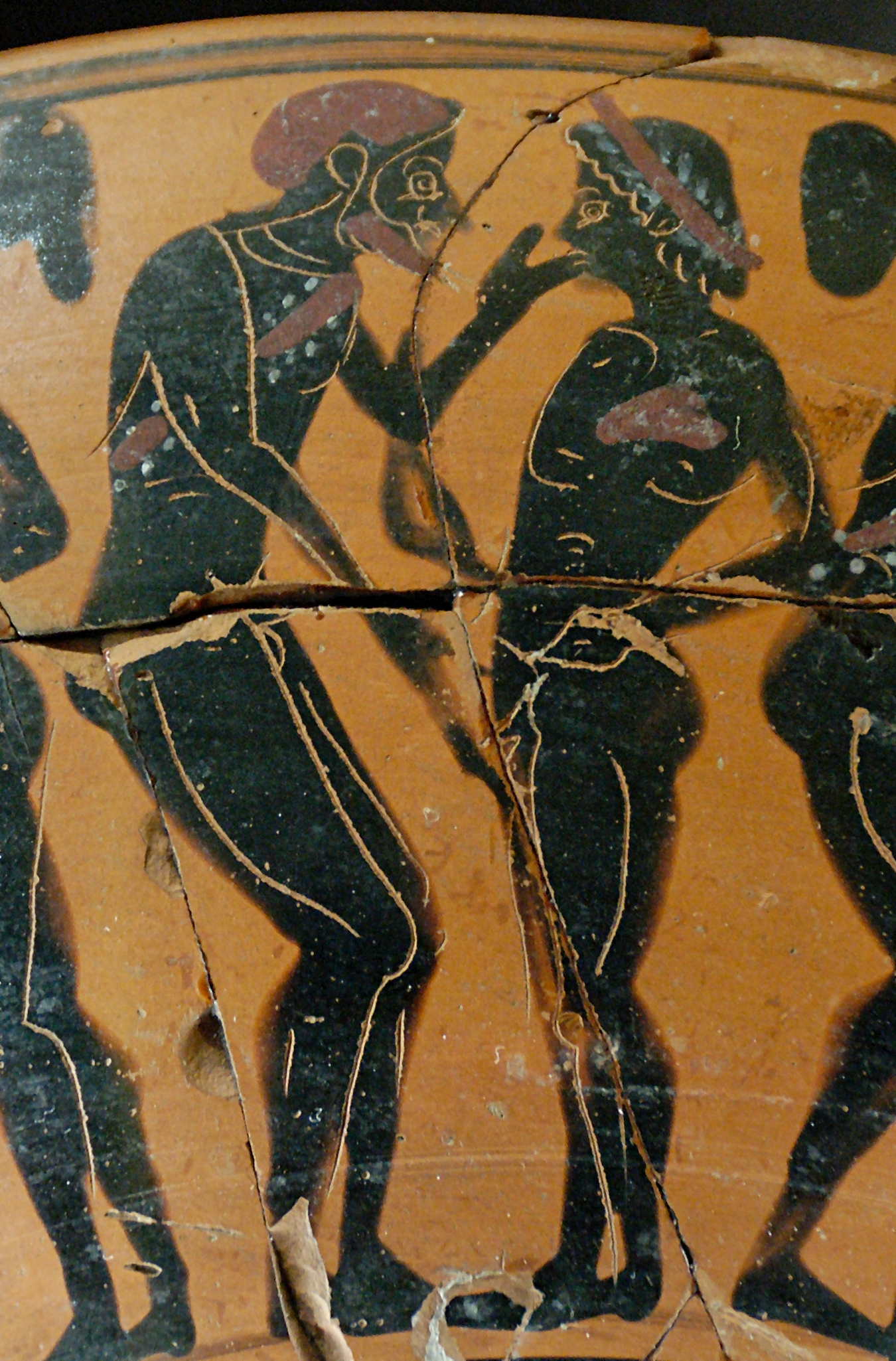
Pederastic scene on an Attic Lekythos. 530–520 BCE

The ethical views held in ancient societies, such as Athens, Thebes, Crete, Sparta, Elis and others, on the practice of pederasty have been explored by scholars only since the end of the 19th century. One of the first to do so was John Addington Symonds, who wrote his seminal work A Problem in Greek Ethics in 1873, but after a private edition of 10 copies (1883), only in 1901 was the work published in revised form.

Edward Carpenter expanded the scope of the study, with his 1914 work, Intermediate Types among Primitive Folk. The text examines homoerotic practices of all types, not only pederastic ones, and ranges over cultures spanning the globe. In Germany the study was continued by classicist Paul Brandt writing under the pseudonym Hans Licht, who published Sexual Life in Ancient Greece in 1932.

Kenneth J. Dover's seminal Greek Homosexuality (1978) triggered a number of debates which still continue. 20th-century sociologist Michel Foucault declared that pederasty was "problematized" in Greek culture, that it was "the object of a special—and especially intense—moral preoccupation", which was "subjected to an interplay of positive and negative interplays so complex as to make the ethics that governed it difficult to decipher". A modern line of thought leading from Dover to Foucault to David M. Halperin holds that the erômenos did not reciprocate the love and desire of the erastês, and that the relationship was factored on a sexual domination of the younger by the older, a politics of penetration held to be true of all adult male Athenians' relations with their social inferiors—boys, women and slaves. This theory was also propounded by Eva Keuls.

Similarly, Enid Bloch argues that many Greek boys in these relationships may have been traumatized by knowing that they were violating social customs, since the "most shameful thing that could happen to any Greek male was penetration by another male". She further argues that vases showing "a boy standing perfectly still as a man reaches out for his genitals" indicate the boy may have been "psychologically immobilized, unable to move or run away". From this and the previous perspectives, the relationships are characterized and factored on a power differential between the participants, and as essentially asymmetrical.

Other scholars point to more artwork on vases, poetry and philosophical works such as the Platonic discussion of anteros, "love returned", all of which show tenderness and desire and love on the part of the erômenos matching and responding to that of the erastês. Critics of the posture defended by Dover, Bloch and their followers also point out that they ignore all material which argued against their "overly theoretical" interpretation of a human and emotional relationship and counter that "clearly, a mutual, consensual bond was formed", and that it is "a modern fairy tale that the younger erômenos was never aroused".

Halperin's position has been criticized by Thomas K. Hubbard as a "persistently negative and judgmental rhetoric implying exploitation and domination as the fundamental characteristics of pre-modern sexual models", challenging it as a polemic of "mainstream assimilationist gay apologists" and an attempt to "demonize and purge from the movement" all non-orthodox male sexualities, especially those involving adults and adolescents.

As classical historian Robin Osborne has pointed out, historical discussion of paiderastia is complicated by 21st-century moral standards:

It is the historian's job to draw attention to the personal, social, political and indeed moral issues behind the literary and artistic representations of the Greek world. The historian's job is to present pederasty and all, to make sure that … we come face to face with the way the glory that was Greece was part of a world in which many of our own core values find themselves challenged rather than reinforced.

== See also ==
- Age disparity in sexual relationships
- Apollo
- Autolycus of Athens
- Callias III
- Catamite
- Cyparissus
- Greek love
- Hispano-Arabic homoerotic poetry
- History of erotic depictions
- History of human sexuality
- Homosexuality in ancient Greece
- Homosexuality in ancient Rome
- Intercrural sex
- Kagema
- Paideia
- Pederasty
- Platonic love
- Prostitution in ancient Greece
- Sacred Band of Thebes
- Sexuality in ancient Rome
- Wakashū

== Selected bibliography ==
- Dover, Kenneth J. Greek Homosexuality. Duckworth 1978.
- Dover, Kenneth J. "Greek Homosexuality and Initiation", Que(e)rying Religion: A Critical Anthology. Continuum, 1997, pp. 19–38.
- Ellis, Havelock. Studies in the Psychology of Sex, vol. 2: Sexual Inversion. Project Gutenberg text
- Ferrari, Gloria. Figures of Speech: Men and Maidens in Ancient Greece. University of Chicago Press, 2002.
- Hubbard, Thomas K. Homosexuality in Greece and Rome. University of California Press, 2003.Homosexuality in Greece and Rome: a sourcebook of basic documents in translation
- Johnson, Marguerite, and Ryan, Terry. Sexuality in Greek and Roman Society and Literature: A Sourcebook. Routledge, 2005.
- Lear, Andrew, and Eva Cantarella. Images of Ancient Greek Pederasty: Boys Were Their Gods. Routledge, 2008. ISBN 978-0-415-22367-6.
- Lear, Andrew. 'Ancient Pederasty: an introduction' in A Companion to Greek and Roman Sexualities, editor Thomas K. Hubbard (Blackwell, 2014), pp. 102–27.
- Nussbaum, Martha. Sex and Social Justice. Oxford University Press, 1999.
- Percy, William A. Pederasty and Pedagogy in Archaic Greece. University of Illinois Press, 1996.
- Plato. Charmides. Chicago: Encyclopædia Britannica.
- Same–Sex Desire and Love in Greco-Roman Antiquity and in the Classical Tradition of the West. Binghamton: Haworth, 2005.
- Sergent, Bernard. Homosexuality in Greek Myth. Beacon Press, 1986.
