= Arignotus =

Ancient Pythagorean

Arignotus (Ancient Greek: Ἀρίγνωτος) was a Pythagorean in the time of Lucian—that is, the 2nd century CE—who was renowned for his wisdom, and had the surname of ἱερός ("the holy"). He is described as telling a story of a time he exorcised a demon that was haunting a home.

Arignotus is described as shabby and dirty, wearing his hair long and having a grave expression. Modern scholars have suggested that there was not a historical person with this name, but that "Arignotus" represents a popularly known type of the time, and is essentially a stand-in for Pythagoras himself. Other scholars disagree with this hypothesis.

There is an unrelated, otherwise unknown Arignotus mentioned in Aeschines's speech Against Timarchus.
