= Diocletian (disambiguation) =

Diocletian was a Roman emperor who ruled from 284–305 AD.

Diocletian may also refer to:

== Architecture ==
- Aqueduct of Diocletian, a Roman aqueduct near Split, Croatia
- Baths of Diocletian, a bath complex in Rome, Italy
- Camp of Diocletian, a military complex at Palmyra, Syria
- Diocletian's Palace, an ancient fortress which forms the core of the modern town of Split, Croatia
- Diocletian window, large windows characteristic of Ancient Roman bath complexes

== Other uses ==
- Diocletian (band), a war metal band from New Zealand
- Dioclesian, a tragicomic semi-opera by Henry Purcell

== See also ==
- Diocletianopolis (disambiguation)
