= Thomas Hubbard (historian) =

American historian

Thomas K. Hubbard is an American historian who has written about the topic of homosexuality in Ancient Greece. He served as a professor at the University of Texas (UT) for over 30 years and worked as chair at the American Philological Association's Placement Committee. He was included in the Epstein files.

Hubbard's 1998 article titled Popular Perceptions of elitist Homosexuality in Classical Athens became influential among critics of the phallocentric paradigm of homosexuality in Ancient Greece, promoted by Michel Foucault and Kenneth Dover, according to which the male act of sexual penetration was seen as an assertion of dominance over women, boys and other men, as opposed to a more pure manifestation of sexual desire. He is also the author of the book Homosexuality in Greece and Rome: A Sourcebook of Basic Documents (2003).

== Career ==
=== Early years ===
Hubbard has had a relatively conservative approach regarding queer issues. In the 1990s, while LGBT activist groups called for the American Philological Association (APA) not to hold meetings in places where sodomy laws against gays and lesbians were active, Hubbard wrote a letter to the APA Newsletter denouncing the suggestion. Years later, when APA Committee member John Rundin suggested that the APA should encourage its hiring institutions to disclose if they offered domestic partner benefits to partners of gay and lesbian employees, Hubbard, then serving as chair in the APA's Placement Committee, campaigned against Rundin's suggestions.

=== Academic works ===
The Pipes of Pan: Intertextuality and Literary Filiation in the Pastoral Tradition from Theocritus to Milton (1998)

The mask of comedy : Aristophanes and the intertextual parabasis (1991)

Greek Love Reconsidered (editor: 2000)

Popular Perceptions of elitist Homosexuality in Classical Athens (1998)

Hubbard's article titled Popular Perceptions of elitist Homosexuality in Classical Athens (1998) became very influential among critics of the phallocentric paradigm of Ancient Greek pederasty promoted by Michel Foucault and Kenneth Dover (in which men engaged in homosexual sex not just for pleasure, but to assert dominance over women and other males). The article was criticized most notably by researchers Andrew Lear and Julia Shapiro, though both critics agreed with Hubbard in that homosexual sex was never seen by Ancient Greeks as always unquestionably good and moral, and that such acts were often subjects of debate in Greek history.

==== Homosexuality in Greece and Rome (2003) ====
In 2003, Hubbard published a book titled Homosexuality in Greece and Rome: A Sourcebook of Basic Documents.

In the book, he compiles "in as complete a form as is possible" a selection of English-language excerpts concerning homosexuality in Ancient Greece and Rome from the period between Archaic Greece and the Greco-Roman age, with the exclusion of sources written under Christian influence. In the book, Hubbard does not make any distinction between sex and gender, which is commonly made among feminists and gender theorists. He does, however, use the word "homosexuality" throughout the book, since he believes that sexual identity is transhistorical and the word conveniently links together a range of different phenomena relating to same-sex activities.

==== Censoring Sex Research: The Debate over Male Intergenerational Relations (editor with Beert Verstraete: 2013) ====
Responses from twelve scholars that argue for or against the conclusions of the academic paper involved in the Rind et al. controversy.

=== Connection with Jeffrey Epstein ===
In 2015, Hubbard requested $10,000–$20,000 from Jeffrey Epstein's charitable organization for a 2016 conference. Hubbard's request for financial support from Jeffrey Epstein was made seven years after Epstein pleaded guilty in 2008 to solicitation of prostitution with a minor. In an email statement to The Daily Texan Newspaper, Hubbard wrote of Epstein: '“Like over 1,000,000 Americans, he did have a conviction for a sex-related offense, but from what I could see in 2015, it was for something that would not even have been illegal in most European countries and resulted in a very short sentence.” Attendance at the conference was mandatory for the students in Hubbard's 'Mythology of Rape' class. The conference was titled Theorizing Consent: Educational and Legal Perspectives on Campus Rape. His request expressed concern that Title IX had recent bad, irrational legislation. Videos of conference sessions are available online.

When later asked about his request, Hubbard said his opinion is that Epstein was not a pedophile, but instead was an ephebophile, and that Epstein was taken advantage of by sex workers looking to "cash in".

=== University of Texas controversy ===
In 2020, while he was serving as a professor at the University of Texas, Hubbard was accused by a group of UT students of defending sexual relationships between adults and minors in his lectures and publications. After students campaigned for his removal, Hubbard's house in Austin was vandalized. He filed multiple libel lawsuits against his accusers. In one of the lawsuits, Hubbard accused the Popular Women's Movement of having sprayed a graffiti on his door. Prior to the controversy, Hubbard had served at the UT for over 30 years and had received no complaints of sexual misconduct. Hubbard brought claims of employment discrimination against the University of Texas, and in 2021 received a substantial settlement, which required him to retire, and withdraw his suits.

One of the students Hubbard had sued, Sarah Blakemore, daughter of Republican political consultant Allen Blakemore, then filed a motion to sanction Hubbard for bringing frivolous claims. However, a court dismissed her case, finding that Hubbard's suit was not brought in bad faith, or for improper purposes, or was frivolous, and further ordered that the cause of action be removed from the docket. Subsequently, Texas Republican Senator Paul Bettencourt, whom Allen Blakemore had worked for, filed a bill in the Texas Legislature that would allow a public college or university to revoke a faculty member’s tenure if they filed a civil lawsuit against a student. Questioned by a reporter, Bettencourt denied that the bill was written as a favor to Allen, calling the suggestion "hogwash".
