= Idyll XII =

Idyll XII, sometimes called Ἀίτης ('The Beloved' or 'The Passionate Friend'), is a bucolic poem by the 3rd-century BC Greek poet Theocritus.

== Analysis ==
Andrew Lang thinks this is rather a lyric than an idyll, being an expression of that singular passion which existed between men in historical Greece. The Greeks sometimes exalted friendship to a passion, and such a friendship may have inspired this poem. The next idyll, like the Myrmidons of Aeschylus, attributes the same manners to mythical and heroic Greece, and the affection between Homeric warriors like Achilles and Patroclus.

Theocritus acknowledges his indebtedness to the Ionian lyrists and elegists by using their dialect. According to J. M. Edmonds, the passage rendered here in verse contains what at first sight looks like a mere display of learning, but has simply this intention: 'Our love will be famous among so remote a posterity that the very words for it will be matter for learned comment.'

== See also ==
- Diocles of Megara

== Sources ==
Attribution:

- Edmonds, J. M., ed. (1919). The Greek Bucolic Poets (3rd ed.). William Heinemann. pp. 149–53.
- Lang, Andrew, ed. (1880). Theocritus, Bion, and Moschus. London: Macmillan and Co. pp. 61–2.
