= Eva Cantarella =

Italian classicist

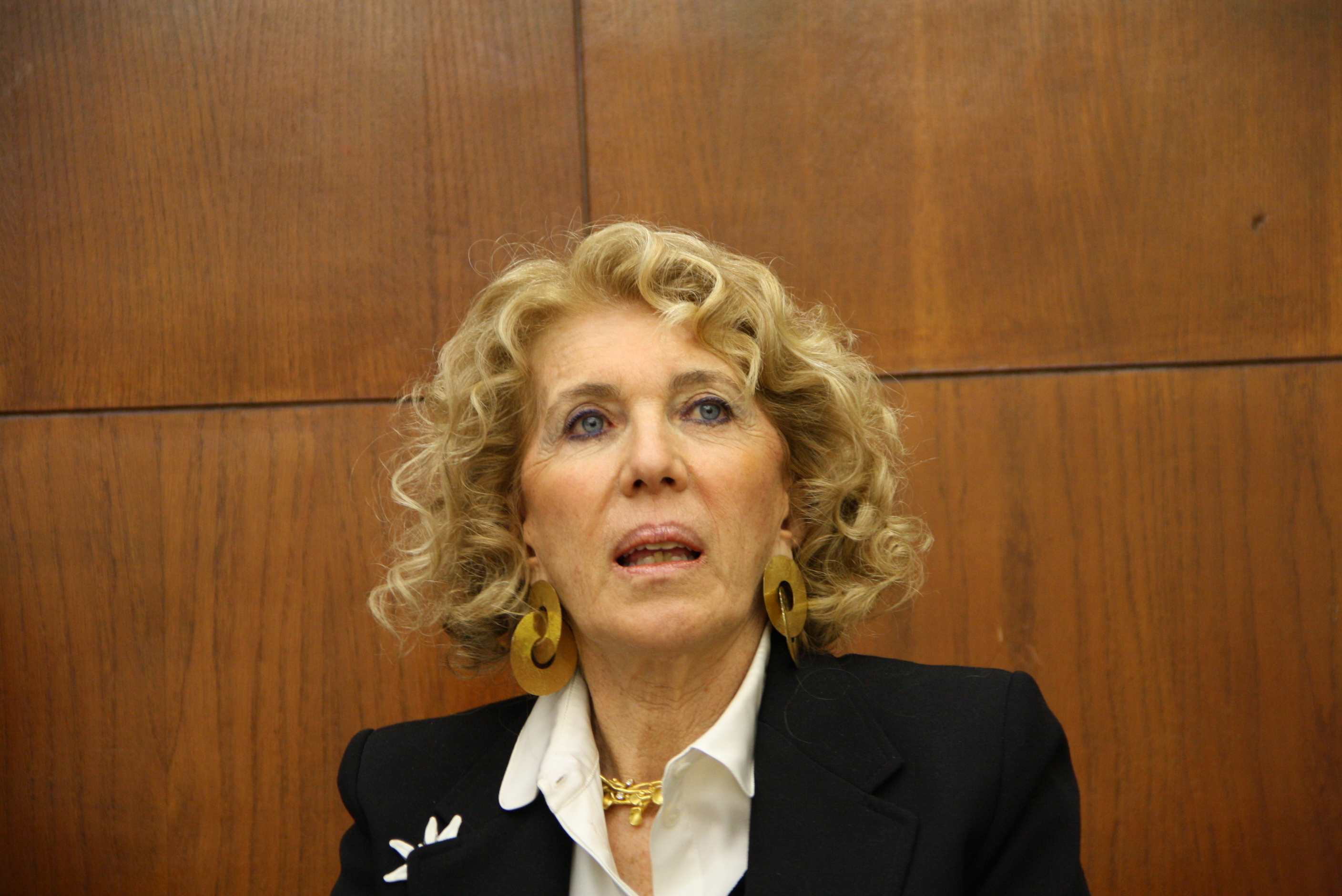
- Cantarella in 2012
- Born: 1936 (age 89–90); Rome

Academic background
- Education: University of Milan

Academic work
- Discipline: Classicist
- Sub-discipline: Roman law; Ancient Greek law
- Institutions: University of Milan

Eva Cantarella (born 28 November 1936) is an Italian classicist. She is professor of Roman law and ancient Greek law at the University of Milan, and has served as Dean of the Law School at the University of Camerino.

== Biography ==
Cantarella is known for examining ancient law by relating it to modern legal issues through law and society perspective. She has researched subjects involving the legal and social history of sexuality, women's conditions, criminal law and capital punishment.

She has written many books, which have been translated into several languages, including English, French, German and Spanish. Cantarella is also editor of Dike - International Journal of Greek Law and a member of several editorial boards such as Apollo - Bollettino dei Musei provinciali del Salernitano; Dioniso; Crime, Histoire et Societés; Revista des estudios latinos; and CADMO - Revista de História Antiga (University of Lisbon).

Cantarella has been professor of Roman law and ancient Greek law at the University of Milan, Italy. She has been dean of the Law School of the University of Camerino. She has also taught and given lectures at many universities in Europe and the United States. She has been appointed Global Professor at New York University School of Law.

Cantarella has argued that penetration was normal in ancient Greek pederasty.

== Awards and honours ==
- Grand Officer of the Order of Merit of the Italian Republic - 2 July 2002
- Premio Bagutta - 2003
- Premio Hemingway - 2019

== Bibliography ==
=== Books in English ===
- With Andrew Lear, Images of Ancient Greek Pederasty: Boys Were Their Gods (London: Routledge), 2008. ISBN 978-0-415-22367-6
- Pandora's Daughters: The Role and Status of Women in Greek and Roman Antiquity (Baltimore: Johns Hopkins University Press), 1987; 2nd Printing, hardcover and paperback 1989; 4th printing 1993.
- Bisexuality in the Ancient World (New Haven: Yale University Press), 1992, reprinted 1993; first paperback edition 1994; trade paperback edition 2002. ISBN 0-300-04844-0
- With Luciana Jacobelli, A Day in Pompeii: Daily Life, Culture and Society (Naples: Electa), 2004.

=== Authored books ===
- La fideiussione reciproca. Allellegue e mutua fideiussio (Milan: Giuffrè), 1965.
- Studi sull'omicidio in diritto greco e romano (Milan: Giuffrè), 1976.
- Norma e sanzione in Omero (Milan: Giuffrè), 1979.
- L'ambiguo malanno. Condizione e immagine della donna nell' antichità greca e romana (Rome: Editori Riuniti), 1981 (2nd edition 1985, 3rd edition Einaudi 1995); Spanish translation La calamidad ambigua (Madrid: Ediciones Clasicas), 1991; Greek translation Oi gynaikes tes archaias Elladas (Athens: Papademas), 1998.
- Tacita Muta. Le donne nella città antica (Rome: Editori Riuniti), 1985.
- Secondo natura. La bisessualità nel mondo antico (Rome: Editori Riuniti), 1988 (2nd expanded and updated edition Milan, Rizzoli, 1995); French translation Selon la nature, l' usage et la loi. La bisexualité dans le monde antique (Paris: Éditions La Découverte), 1991; Spanish translation Segun la natura. La bisexualidad en el mundo antiguo (Madrid: Akal Universitaria), 1991.
- Le donne e la città (Como: New Press Edizioni), 1990.
- I supplizi capitali in Grecia e a Roma (Milan: Rizzoli), 1991; French translation: Les supplices capitaux en Grece at à Rome (Paris, Albin Michel), 2000.
- Passato prossimo. Donne romane da Tacita a Sulpicia, Milano, Feltrinelli, 1996; Spanish translation Pasado proximo, Mujeres romanas de Tacita a Sulpicia (Valencia: Editiones Catedra), 1998.
- El peso de Roma en la cultura europea (Madrid: Ediciones Akal), 1996.
- Phonos, Antologia di oratori attici sull’omicidio (Milan: Mursia), 1989.
- Pompei: I volti dell’amore (Milan: Mondadori), 1998; German translation Pompeji: Liebe und Erotik in einer römischen Stadt (Berlin: Theiss), 1999; French translation Pompéi: les visages de l’amour (Paris: Albin Michel), 1999.
- Un giorno a Pompei. Vita quotidiana, cultura, società (with L. Jacobelli) (Naples: Electa), 1999.
- Itaca, Eroi, donne, potere tra vendetta e diritto (Milan: Feltrinelli), 2002; French translation Ithaque. De la vengeance d’Ulysse à la naissance di droi (Paris: Albin Michel), 2002.
- L’amore è un dio (Milan: Feltrinelli), 2007.
- Il ritorno della vendetta (Milan: Rizzoli), 2007.
