= Dioclea =

Dioclea or Diocleia, and also Dioklea or Diokleia may refer to:

- Diocleia (festival), an annual festival in ancient Megara in honor of the hero Diocles, famous for the kissing contest between men
- Dioclea (state), a medieval state of Duklja, in south-eastern part of modern Montenegro
- Dioclea in Praevalitana, an ancient Roman and Byzantine city in the Province of Praevalitana, near modern Podgorica in Montenegro
- Dioclea in Phrygia, an ancient city and former bishopric in Phrygia (Asia Minor)
- Dioclea (plant), a genus of plants in the family Fabaceae

== See also ==
- Doclea (disambiguation)
- Diocletianopolis (disambiguation)
