= Images of Ancient Greek Pederasty =

2008 book by Andrew Lear and Eva Cantarella

Images of Ancient Greek Pederasty: Boys Were Their Gods
- Author: Andrew Lear, Eva Cantarella
- Language: English
- Publisher: 270
- Publication date: 2008
- ISBN: 978-0415223676

Images of Ancient Greek Pederasty: Boys Were Their Gods is a book by Andrew Lear and Eva Cantarella, published by Routledge in 2008.

== Content ==
The book examines the topic of classic pederasty through its representations in Athenian vase-paintings, especially in the fifth and sixth centuries. It examines subjects such as courtship, the Greek pantheon and vase dating.

The book included 111 illustrations of pederastic iconography.

== Reception ==
A review on the American Journal of Archeology described the book as "a well-balanced and superbly written book—and one that is no doubt destined for classic status." Another review on The Gay & Lesbian Review Worldwide described it as a "timely book".
