= Diocles of Megara =

Ancient Greek warrior

Diocles of Megara (Greek: Διοκλῆς ὁ Μεγαρεύς) was an ancient Greek warrior from Athens who died a hero in Megara.

== Life ==
Diocles was known for his pederasty in ancient Greece. He was exiled from Athens for an unknown reason and took refuge in Megara, where he met and fell in love with a young man, but during a battle he was slain while protecting his beloved with his shield. Moved by Diocles' sacrifice, the Megarians buried the gallant lover with heroic honors. In commemoration of his faithful attachment, the festival of the Diocleia was instituted.

== Diocleia ==
The Diocleia were held annually at the beginning of spring, when boys and young men would gather at Diocles' sacred tomb for gymnastic (naked games) and other contests, including a kissing contest: one man was chosen as the referee and he who gave him the sweetest kiss would be awarded a garland of flowers. The referee would say a prayer to the divine hero Ganymede, beloved of the god king Zeus, asking that his lips be able to discern the best kiss.

== In literature ==
In Aristophanes' play Acharnians (425 BCE), the character identified as a Megarian swears "By Diocles!", from which we may infer that he was held in great honour by the Megarians.

According to Megarian belief, Diocles was a Megarian ruler of Eleusis.

== See also ==
- Idyll XII
