= Doclea =

Doclea or Docleia, and also Doklea or Dokleia may refer to:

- Doclea (city), ancient Illyrian, Roman and Byzantine city, near modern Podgorica in Montenegro
- Doclea (state), medieval principality of Duklja, in south-eastern part of modern Montenegro
- Doclean Academy of Sciences and Arts, an academic institution in modern Montenegro
- Doclea (crab), a genus of crabs
- Archdiocese of Doclea, a Roman Catholic diocese, now a titular see

== See also ==
- Docleatae
- Dioclea (disambiguation)
- Diocletianopolis (disambiguation)
