= Against Timarchus =

Speech by Aeschines

"Against Timarchus" (Greek: Κατὰ Τιμάρχου) was a speech by Aeschines accusing Timarchus of being unfit to involve himself in public life. The case was brought about in 346–345 BC, in response to Timarchus, along with Demosthenes, bringing a suit against Aeschines, accusing him of misconduct as an ambassador to Philip II of Macedon. The speech provides evidence of a number of actions which, according to Aeschines, would cause a citizen to lose the right of addressing the Assembly. Aeschines accuses Timarchus of two of these forbidden acts: prostituting himself, and wasting his inheritance. Along with the accusations of prostitution and squandering his inheritance for which Timarchus was on trial of Areopagus, the speech contains charges of "bribery, sycophancy, the buying of office, embezzlement, and perjury" and emphasizes Aeschines' disgust with Timarchus' excessive lifestyle.

Modern scholars have criticised the lack of evidence that Aeschines put forward in Against Timarchus, for instance by pointing out that he has no evidence that any of Timarchus' lovers ever paid him. Indeed, Hubbard observes that he does not even manage to produce a single witness who will testify that Timarchus had any sexual relationship with the men in question at all, though in his speeches Aeschines says that Timarchus' affairs were well known to the jury. Because Aeschines attacks Timarchus' moral character in response to political allegations made against him, the speech is classified as an example of an ad hominem argument. Passwater argues that sex work in general is not the basis for the ad hominem, since pederasty was a socially accepted practice of the upper class. Instead, the accusation implies sex work in exchange for money, and purchased by men of a lower class than political officials, rather than sex work in exchange for mentorship and access to a political education as in pederasty. Aeschines won the case, and Timarchus was punished by disenfranchisement.
