= Diocletianopolis =

Diocletianopolis or Diokletianoupolis (Ancient Greek: Διοκλητιανούπολις) may refer to a number of places in the ancient world named after Emperor Diocletian.

- Diocletianopolis (Palestine), in modern Israel
- Diocletianopolis (Thebais), in modern Egypt
- Diocletianopolis (Thrace), in modern Bulgaria
- Diocletianopolis (Kastoria) in Greece
- Diocletianopolis (Pella) in Greece

== See also ==
- Dioclea (disambiguation)
- Doclea (disambiguation)
