= Andrew Lear =

American academic

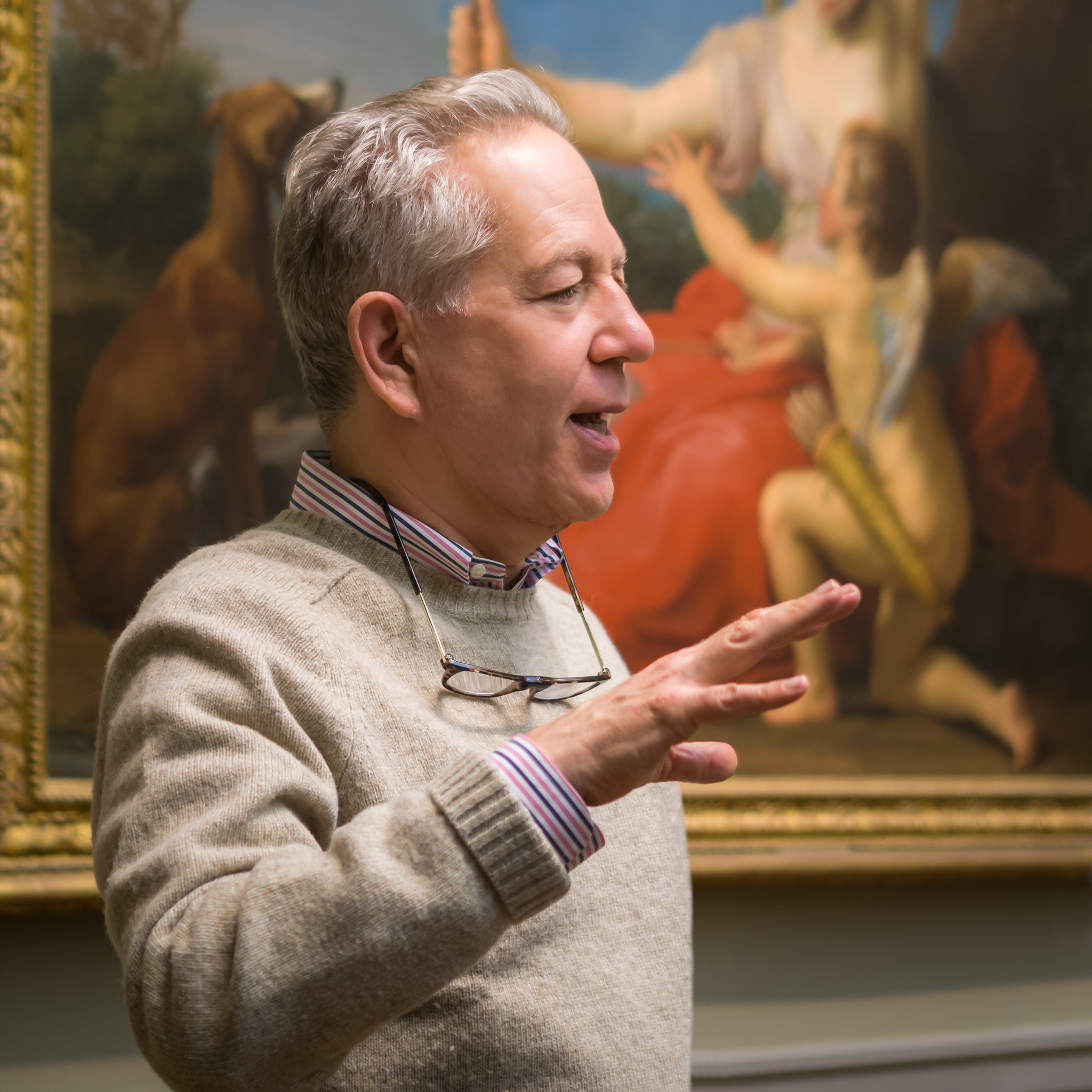
- Born: December 21, 1958 (age 67); Boston, Massachusetts, US
- Education: Harvard University; University of Virginia; University of California, Los Angeles

Andrew Lear (born December 21, 1958) is an American author, Classicist, historian of gender and sexuality, and public historian. His academic research focuses on concepts of gender and sexuality in ancient Greek poetry and art. His book on male-male erotic scenes in ancient Athenian vase-painting (Images of Ancient Greek Pederasty: Boys Were Their Gods, co-authored with Eva Cantarella, Routledge 2008), was positively reviewed: it greatly expanded the number of known scenes and proposed a sophisticated framework for their interpretation. He has written articles on topics including gender ideals in the work of Greek poets Anacreon and Theognis, as well as book reviews for Classical World. Lear is seen as an expert on the comparison between ancient and modern views and practices of gender and sexuality.

== Career ==
Lear has taught at Harvard, Columbia, Pomona College, and NYU. He won the Harvard Certificate for Excellence in Teaching four times. His teaching reflects a wide range of interests in the Humanities. Before doing his PhD in classics, Lear taught French and Italian language courses at Harvard: he is fluent in both languages, as well as German. He was also a section leader for Helen Vendler's course "Poems, Poets, Poetry." As a Classics professor, he has taught courses in departments of Classics, History, and Women's and Gender Studies, including Greek and Latin language, Greek and Roman history, Greek literature, and courses on gender and sexuality.

Aside from his Classics degrees, Lear has an MA in creative writing from City University of New York, where he studied with Cynthia Ozick. His short stories, poems, and translations have appeared in such journals as Persephone, the Southern Humanities Review, and Literary Imagination. He edited Laura Argiri's historical novel The God in Flight, as is acknowledged in the dedication. Lear also performs actively as a baritone and gives lecture/performances about the Jewish and gay composers and librettists of the German pop industry in the Weimar period.

=== Pioneering LGBT Historical Tours: Founding Oscar Wilde Tours ===
Lear's work includes efforts to bring the history of gender and sexuality to a wide public beyond the academy, through blog posts, lectures, and educational tours that he designs and leads. In 2013, he founded Oscar Wilde Tours, the first tour company focused on LGBT history. Oscar Wilde Tours gives LGBT history walking tours of Greenwich Village, as well as "gay secrets" museum tours that illuminate the history of homosexuality hidden in the collections of the New York Metropolitan Museum of Art, Boston's Museum of Fine Arts, and London's National Portrait Gallery. In early 2020, the company launched a new tour at the Metropolitan Museum of Art about the history of the male nude in art. Oscar Wilde Tours also offers multi-day tours focused on LGBT history and art. It won the Travvy silver prize in 2016 for best LGBT tour operator and tied with HE Travel for the Gay Travel Awards Tour Operator of the Year; in 2018, Lux Review gave Oscar Wilde Tours the tourism award for Best International LGBT Tour Provider, and in 2019 it won the award for Best Gay Travel Specialist, Northeast USA.

=== Expanding Narratives: Shady Ladies Tours and Recognition ===
In 2016, Lear expanded this line by founding Shady Ladies Tours, a tour company focused on women’s history. Their Shady Ladies tour of the Metropolitan Museum presents depictions of royal mistresses and courtesans in the collection, and the Nasty Women tour is about pathbreaking women from Pharaoh Hatshepsut to Gertrude Stein. Shady Ladies won the Lux Global Excellence Award in 2017 for best museum tour operator in New York.

=== Adapting to Challenges: Virtual Initiatives and Future Projects ===
During the COVID-19 pandemic, Oscar Wilde Tours offered a series of virtual lectures called Zooming Through Queer Culture. Shady Ladies tours also offered virtual lectures. Lear designed and recorded “Out on View” for the Wadsworth Atheneum, the first LGBT audio tour in a US museum. He is developing an LGBT history TV series called “From Sodom to Stonewall” with actor/author Stephen Fry.
