= Achilles and Patroclus =

Relationship in Classical Greece

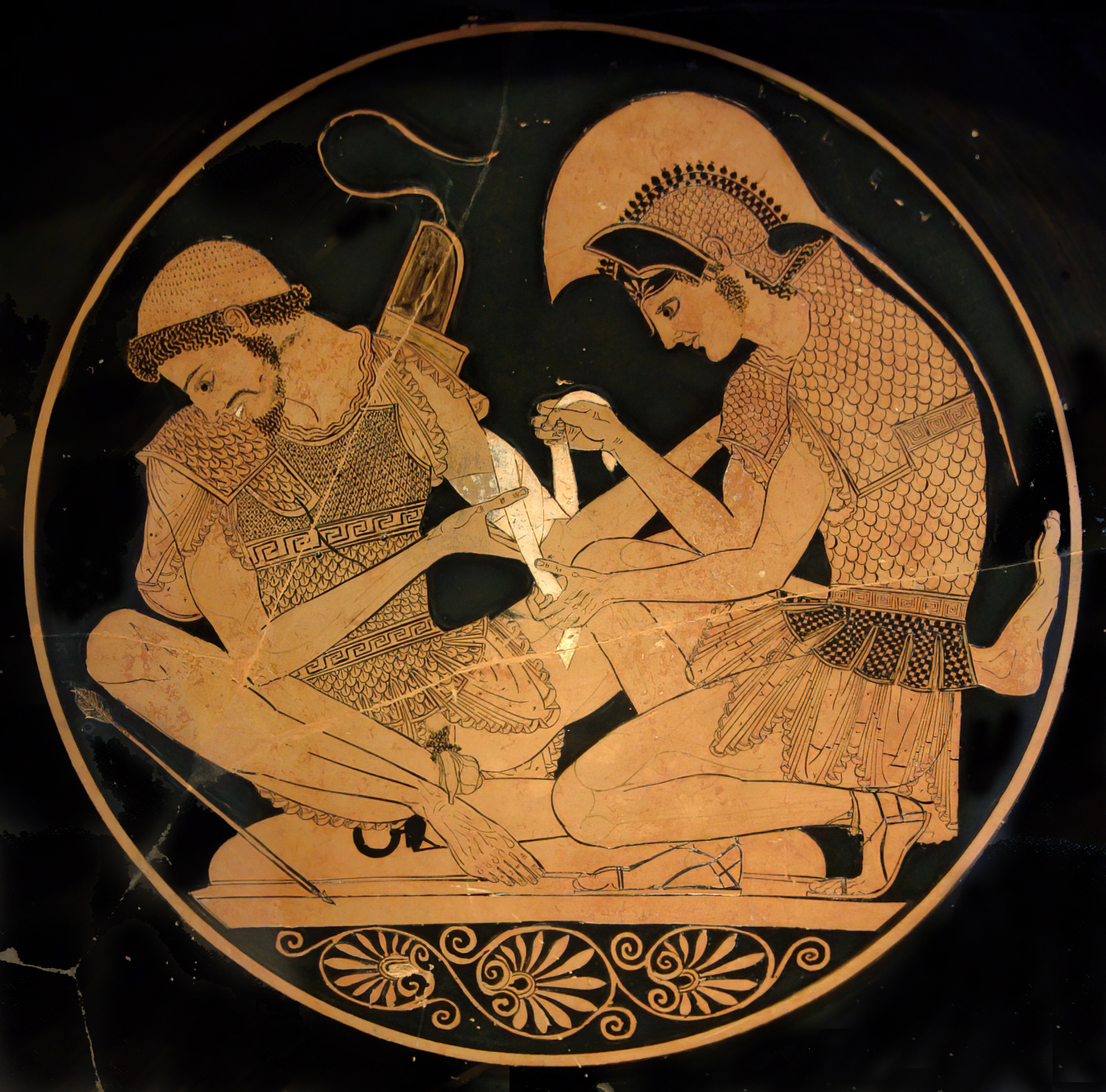
Achilles bandages the arm of Patroclus

The relationship between Achilles and Patroclus is a key element of the stories associated with the Trojan War. In the Iliad, Homer describes a deep, meaningful relationship between Achilles and Patroclus, where Achilles is tender toward Patroclus, but callous and arrogant toward others. Its exact nature—whether homosexual, a non-sexual deep friendship, or something else entirely—has been a subject of dispute in both the Classical period and the modern era.

Homer, in the original epic, never explicitly casts the two as lovers, but they were frequently interpreted and depicted as lovers in the classical period of Greek literature, particularly in the works of Aeschylus, Aeschines and Plato. Other writers at the time, such as Xenophon in his Symposium, say that their relationship was not sexual, but instead an intense friendship. Ancient writers referenced both sides, and additionally debated whether and how the relationship fit into the scheme of pederasty in ancient Greece. Medieval scholars largely characterized the relationship as a non-sexual friendship, sometimes even suppressing certain aspects of Achilles' actions that may be interpreted as homoerotic. Since the 19th century, contemporary critics have returned to the debate of the Iliad's portrayal of the relationship. Some classicists and queer studies scholars argue that it was homosexual, homoerotic, or latently homosexual, with the Iliad describing these elements implicitly. Some historians and classicists disagree, stating that there is no textual evidence for a sexual relationship, and that repressed homosexuality here is unfalsifiable.

== In Homeric epics ==
Achilles and Patroclus are key characters in the Iliad and also appear in the Odyssey, and these texts are treated as the original sources of story for interpretations and adaptations of their relationship. These Homeric epics formed over time as part of a very long oral tradition of tales about the Trojan War. Although both epics have traditionally been attributed to Homer, most scholars today believe the Iliad and Odyssey were not actually composed or written down by the same author. Tales of the Trojan War developed well before the composition of each Homeric epic, and the two epics were written down around the 8th century BC.

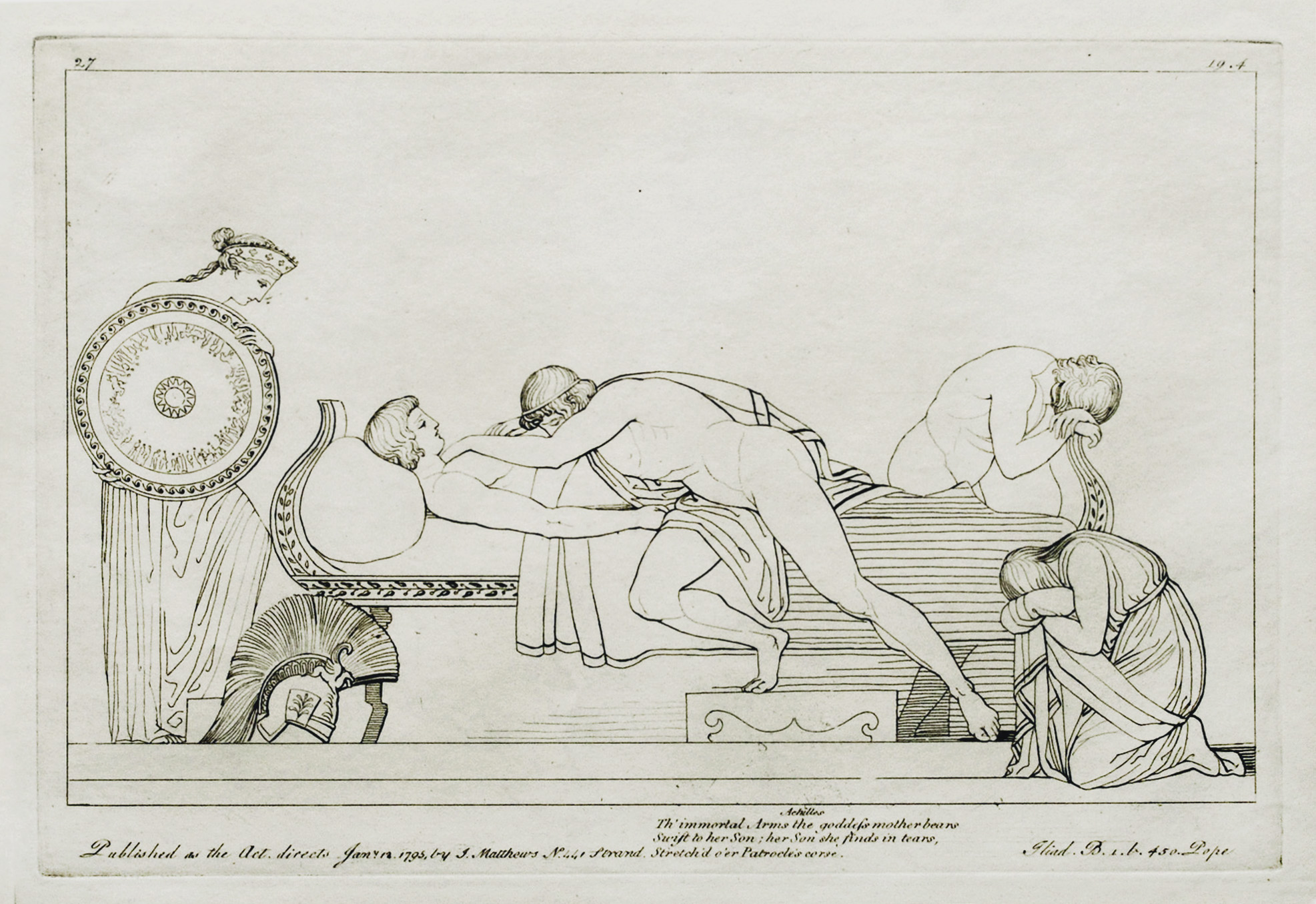
Achilles mourning Patroclus, John Flaxman, 1795

=== Iliad ===
Achilles and Patroclus quarter together in a tent near their Greek allies' fleet of ships. King Agamemnon realizes that Achilles, due to his heroic reputation, needs to enter the fight, but Achilles, having been disrespected by Agamemnon, refuses. Agamemnon sends an envoy to change his mind. In Book IX (lines 225 to 241) two of the diplomats, Odysseus and Ajax, hear Achilles playing the lyre and singing all alone with Patroclus. They both spring to their feet in surprise as the guests approach. After much talk, the embassy fails to convince Achilles to fight. Achilles asks Patroclus to oversee the preparation of a bed in the outer part of the tent for one of the envoys (lines 606 to 713). Then Achilles sleeps next to Diomede and Patroclus next to Iphis in the inner part of their tent.

After more fighting, in Book XI (lines 596 to 654) Nestor arrives back to the Greek allies' base with a wounded soldier. Achilles sends Patroclus out to speak with him. Nestor reminds Patroclus (lines 786 to 804) that his father had long ago taught him that, although Achilles was nobler, Patroclus was still Achilles' elder. Therefore Patroclus should counsel and guide Achilles wisely so that perhaps he would finally enter the fight against the Trojans. If Patroclus could not, then he himself should don Achilles' armor to deceive the Trojans into thinking that Achilles had joined the fight, which should scare them away from the Greek base and back to their own walls.

Later on, the Trojans continue their advance on the Greek allies' base and breach the defensive wall guarding their ships. In Book XVI (lines 1 to 100) Patroclus weeps at the casualties and confronts Achilles over his refusal to fight. Patroclus asks if he can use Achilles' armor to convince the Trojans to turn around. Achilles agrees and warns Patroclus to only go far enough to drive the Trojans from the ships. Achilles tells him he wishes all the other Trojans and Greeks would die so that the pair alone could go sack Troy. Now at Achilles' urging (lines 101 to 256), Patroclus dons Achilles' armor while Achilles rallies his troops, and Achilles prays to Zeus for his success and safe return.

In the rest of Book XVI Patroclus scares the Trojans back as planned, and also kills Sarpedon, a son of Zeus, but then Hector kills Patroclus. In Book XVIII (lines 1 to 77), news of Patroclus' death reaches Achilles through Nestor's son Antilochus, which throws Achilles into deep grief. Antilochus holds Achilles' hand because he fears that Achilles will kill himself. The earlier steadfast and unbreakable Achilles agonizes, tearing his hair and smearing himself with ash. In Book XIX Achilles embraces Patroclus' dead body until dawn and continues fasting. Achilles laments Patroclus' death and recounts that he had liked to imagine, after his own fated death at war, that Patroclus would survive and take Achilles' son home to see his inheritance (lines 282 to 337).

The rage that follows from Patroclus' death becomes the prime motivation for Achilles to return to the battlefield in Book XVIII. He returns to battle with the sole aim of avenging Patroclus' death by killing Hector, despite a warning that doing so would cost him his life. Achilles tells his mother Thetis that he does not want to live after he has got revenge (lines 78 to 147). In Book XXI Achilles even engages in battle with the river god Scamander in his efforts to reach Hector. After defeating Hector in Book XXII, Achilles strips his armor from Hector and gives a speech promising to remember Patroclus for the rest of his life and into the underworld (lines 367 to 404). Achilles then defiles Hector's corpse by dragging it by the heels behind his chariot.

In Book XXIII (lines 68 to 261), Patroclus' ghost appears to Achilles in a dream and laments his death and their separation. Patroclus asks Achilles to ensure that they are both buried together with their bones and ashes mixed in the same funerary urn. As Achilles tries to embrace him, the dream ends. Achilles arranges a grand funeral for Patroclus the next day, arranging the burial of Patroclus in the requested manner. He tells Agamemnon and the other kings to bury his ashes in the same urn once he is dead, and to build a large joint funeral mound for them.

=== Odyssey ===
In Book XXIV (lines 1 to 56) the ghosts of Achilles, Patroclus, Antilochus, and Ajax are found together in the Asphodel meadows, where they meet with Agamemnon's ghost. Agamemnon recounts (lines 57 to 97), that as planned in the Iliad, the bones of Achilles and Patroclus were mixed together in the same golden vase after Achilles' funeral. He notes that after Patroclus' death, Achilles had loved Antilochus most among his comrades. Agamemnon says that Antilochus' bones were placed in the same vase as the pair, although kept separate from their bones.

=== Textual analysis ===
Achilles' strongest interpersonal bond is with Patroclus. As Gregory Nagy points out:

For Achilles [...] in his own ascending scale of affection as dramatized by the entire composition of the Iliad, the highest place must belong to Patroklos [...] In fact Patroklos is for Achilles the πολὺ φίλτατος [...] ἑταῖρος — the 'hetaîros who is the most phílos by far' (XVII 411, 655).

Hetaîros meant 'companion' or 'comrade'; in Homer it is usually used of soldiers under the same commander. While its feminine form (hetaîra) would be used for courtesans, a hetaîros was still a form of soldier in Hellenistic and Byzantine times. In ancient texts, philos (often translated 'most beloved') denoted a general type of love, used for love between family, between friends, a desire or enjoyment of an activity, as well as between lovers.

Achilles' grief at Patroclus' death is described in very similar terms to that of Andromache for her husband Hector. Achilles and Andromache both exhibit extreme grief, and both act in inversely gender-transgressive ways during their grieving process. Achilles adopts the formal speech of lamentation, enacting a role traditionally performed by women, and in a style that no other male heroes of the Iliad mourn in.

Achilles' attachment to Patroclus is an archetypal male bond that occurs elsewhere in Greek culture: the mythical Damon and Pythias, the legendary Orestes and Pylades, and the historical Harmodius and Aristogeiton are pairs of comrades who gladly face danger and death for and beside each other.

In the Oxford Classical Dictionary, David M. Halperin writes:

Homer, to be sure, does not portray Achilles and Patroclus as lovers (although some Classical Athenians thought he implied as much (Aeschylus fragments 135, 136 Radt; Plato Symposium 179e–180b; Aeschines Against Timarchus 133, 141–50)), but he also did little to rule out such an interpretation.

== Classical views in antiquity ==
Since the 5th century BC, Greek writing has dealt with the nature of the relationship between Achilles and Patroclus. The majority of extant works from this period portray the pair as lovers, whether the works are retelling their myth or interpreting their portrayal as written in the Iliad. Because the Iliad never explicitly states the nature of the pair's relationship, there was long-standing debate over textual interpretation, even though there are limited extant works which argue that they were not lovers. Writers who argued most forcefully that the relationship involves sex and same-sex love include Aeschylus, Plato, and Aeschines. Xenophon is the most notable source to refute this portrayal, claiming that the relationship is not erotic.

In Athens, the relationship was often viewed as being both sexual and pederastic. The Greek custom of paiderasteia between members of the same sex, typically men, was a political, intellectual, and sometimes sexual relationship. Its ideal structure consisted of an older erastes (lover, protector), and a younger eromenos (the beloved). The age difference between partners and their respective roles (either active or passive) was considered to be a key feature. Writers that assumed a pederastic relationship between Achilles and Patroclus, such as Plato and Aeschylus, were then faced with a problem of deciding who must be more active and play the role of the erastes. When classical writers labeled their roles, they mostly characterized Achilles as the erastes and Patroclus as the eromenos, although Plato notably flips this characterization. The pair didn't neatly fit into expected pederasty roles, and pederasty may not have been a common institution at the time the Iliad was written, making this a subject of debate.

=== Aeschylus ===
Aeschylus makes the relationship between Achilles and Patroclus the center of his lost trilogy The Myrmidons (5th century BC), explicitly casting the relationship as homoerotic, pederastic, and sexual. Aeschylus assigned Achilles the role of erastes or protector (since he had avenged his lover's death, even though the gods told him it would cost him his own life), and assigned Patroclus the role of eromenos. Achilles publicly laments Patroclus' death, addressing the corpse and criticizing him for letting himself be killed. In a surviving fragment of the play, Achilles speaks of "the reverent company" of Patroclus' thighs and how Patroclus was "ungrateful for many kisses."

=== Pindar ===
Pindar's comparison of the adolescent boxer Hagesidamus and his trainer Ilas to Patroclus and Achilles in Olympian 10.16–21 (476 BC) as well as the comparison of Hagesidamus to Zeus' lover Ganymede in Olympian 10.99–105 suggest that student and trainer had a romantic relationship, especially after Aeschylus' depiction of Achilles and Patroclus as lovers in his play Myrmidons.

=== Plato ===
In Plato's Symposium, written c. 385 BC, the speaker Phaedrus holds up Achilles and Patroclus as an example of divinely approved lovers. Phaedrus argues that Aeschylus erred in claiming Achilles was the erastes because Achilles was more beautiful and youthful than Patroclus (characteristics of the eromenos) as well as more noble and skilled in battle (characteristics of the erastes). Instead, Phaedrus suggests that Achilles is the eromenos whose reverence of his erastes, Patroclus, was so great that he would be willing to die to avenge him.

The poet Bion of Smyrna later referenced Plato's view, and an opposing argument from Xenophon. In his poem, Bion agreed with Plato that the relationship was one of lovers and not just friends.

=== Xenophon ===
Plato's contemporary, Xenophon, in his own Symposium, had Socrates argue that Achilles and Patroclus were merely chaste and devoted comrades in the Iliad. Specifically, according to Socrates: "Homer pictures us Achilles looking upon Patroclus not as the object of his passion but as a comrade, and in this spirit signally avenging his death". Xenophon cites other examples of legendary comrades, such as Orestes and Pylades, who were renowned for their joint achievements rather than any erotic relationship. Notably, in Xenophon's Symposium, the host Kallias and the young pankration victor Autolycos are called erastes and eromenos.

This interpretation of the Iliad relationship as non-sexual influenced later authors. It is referenced in works from Dio Chrysostom, Lucian, Plutarch, Themistius, and Libanius.

=== Aeschines ===
Aeschines, at his trial in 345 BC, placed an emphasis on the importance of paiderasteia to the Greeks, and argues that though Homer does not state it explicitly, educated people should be able to read between the lines: "Although (Homer) speaks in many places of Patroclus and Achilles, he hides their love and avoids giving a name to their friendship, thinking that the exceeding greatness of their affection is manifest to such of his hearers as are educated men." Aeschines presented the relationship as pederastic, noble, chaste and loving, and cites the Iliad in his speech. Aeschines describes Achilles as the erastes in the relationship.

Most ancient writers (among the most influential Plutarch, Theocritus, Martial, Meleager, and Lucian) followed the thinking laid out by Aeschines. The poets Bion of Smyrna and Strato also characterized the relationship as pederastic, with Achilles as the erastes.

=== Aristarchus of Samothrace ===
Attempts to edit Homer's text were undertaken by Aristarchus of Samothrace in Alexandria around 200 BC. Aristarchus believed that Homer did not intend for Achilles and Patroclus to be lovers. However, Aristarchus thought one passage of the Iliad implied Achilles was in love with Patroclus. Aristarchus disavowed these lines, arguing that it was an edited section from someone who wanted Achilles and Patroclus to be lovers. In the text, Achilles wishes that every Greek and Trojan except himself and Patroclus would die, so that the two can sack Troy together. Aristarchus thought this was too intense and believed Homer's Achilles was too sympathetic to wish for all the Greeks and Trojans to die this way.

=== Pseudo-Apollodorus ===
According to Pseudo-Apollodorus, Patroclus was the son of Menoetius and Polymele. After Patroclus killed a young boy in anger, Menoetius gave him to Peleus, the father of Achilles. As such, Patroclus can be seen as a brother-like figure to Achilles.

=== Other interpretations from antiquity ===
Statius in the Achilleid states that Achilles and Patroclus were either within the same age group, or acted as if they were. This signifies that he did not assign a strict pederastic role to either of them based on their ages. Statius described a "great love" between the pair since their youth, using language that is left ambiguous as to whether it is homoerotic.

The poet Theocritus characterizes the relationship as sexual in one of his poems. This poem can be read as implying the relationship is more egalitarian than traditional pederasty roles allow.

Chariton of Aphrodisias and Apollonius Rhodius viewed the Iliad's version of the relationship between Achilles and Patroclus as homoerotic, according to modern classicists Gabriel Laguna-Mariscal and Manuel Sanz-Morales. This is because the ancient writers allude to Homeric passages about the relationship when they are writing of love within erotic contexts in their own works.

When Alexander the Great and his confidant Hephaestion passed through the city of Troy on their Asian campaign, Alexander honoured the sacred tomb of Achilles and Patroclus in front of the entire army, and this was taken as a clear declaration of their own relationship. The joint tomb and Alexander's action demonstrates the perceived significance of the Achilles–Patroclus relationship at that time (around 334 BC).

== Later adaptations ==
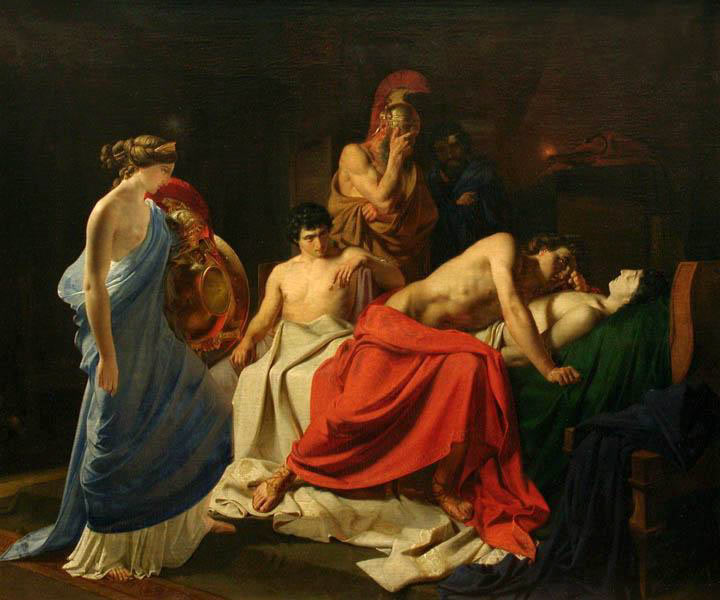
Achilles Lamenting the Death of Patroclus (1855) by the Russian realist Nikolai Ge

During the Middle Ages, the classical tradition frequently portrayed Achilles as heterosexual and having an exemplary non-sexual friendship with Patroclus. Medieval Christian writers deliberately suppressed the homoerotic nuances of the figure.

=== Medieval Era ===
An influential 12th century telling of the Trojan War, the French Roman de Troie, depicts Hector's explicit claim of a sexual relationship between Achilles and Patroclus. The author, Benoît de Saint-Maure, creates a scene where Achilles and Hector insult each other and trade challenges. After Achilles earnestly recounts his great pain at Patroclus' death, Hector encourages him to try for revenge via a duel: "for both the grief you feel for your companion from whom I've separated you, whom so often you have felt naked in your naked arms, and for other jousts vicious and shameful, of which the greater part are hateful to the gods." Hector's taunts portray a sexual relationship between Achilles and Patroclus and cast it as offensive. The encounter enrages and shames Achilles, who calls Hector to fight immediately. Later in the work, Achilles falls in love with a woman, Polyxena, on the anniversary of Patroclus' death. Scholars Alfred Adler and Tamara Faith O'Callaghan see the new relationship as a literary contrast to Achilles' earlier relationship with Patroclus, with the story portraying the later heterosexual love as deeper.

Guido delle Colonne's prominent 13th century Latin translation of the Roman de Troie, the Historiae Destructionis Troiae, removes Hector's claim that Achilles and Patroclus were lovers, but retains Achilles' deep grief for Patroclus. Guido's translation portrays the pair as in an ideal friendship.

One 13th century Spanish retelling of the Iliad deliberately removes all erotic imagery between Achilles and Patroclus. This tale is a modified translation of the Ilias Latina, a late antiquity poem on the Trojan War, and is embedded inside a larger epic on Alexander the Great, the Libro de Alexandre. The Spanish poet modifies the Ilias Latina in several places, including in how Achilles grieves Patroclus. The poet removes references to Achilles lying on Patroclus' corpse, kissing him, and tearing off clothes. The author also heightens the grief and actions of the other Greeks to closer match Achilles', and adds a simile that Achilles grieves Patroclus "as if he were his father or his grandfather." Ian Michael argues the poet did this to make Achilles's actions respectable for a contemporary audience.

=== Renaissance Era ===
==== Hermaphroditus ====
Antonio Beccadelli's collection of erotic poetry, the Hermaphroditus, includes a poem describing intercourse between Achilles and Patroclus. The collection was popular but also sparked condemnation, and Pope Eugenius IV threatened to excommunicate anyone reading it.

==== Shakespeare ====
William Shakespeare's play Troilus and Cressida portrays Achilles and Patroclus as lovers in the eyes of the Greeks. Achilles' decision to spend his days in his tent with Patroclus is seen by Odysseus (called Ulysses in the play) and many other Greeks as the chief reason for anxiety about Troy.

=== Modern Era ===
==== Troy (2004) ====
The film Troy presented Patroclus as a younger relative of Achilles, without any romantic or sexual aspects. (In the Iliad, it is explicitly stated that Patroclus was the older and more responsible of the two.) The film presents the pair as cousins and is one of the main modern inspirations for reading the pair as close relatives. It justifies their bond as arising from kinship and guardianship rather than friendship. According to historian Cezary Kucewicz, this is a departure from previous interpretations of the pair as either close comrades or lovers. Although Achilles and Patroclus were related in original tellings via Aegina, a nymph, ancient sources rarely emphasised this. In an uncommon variant of the myth attributed to the poet Hesiod, the pair are portrayed as direct cousins via their fathers, Menoetius and Peleus.

==== The Song of Achilles ====
Madeline Miller's The Song of Achilles (2011) is a coming-of-age story told from Patroclus' point of view, showing the development of a loving and sexual relationship between Achilles and Patroclus. Miller wrote that her portrayal of the pair as lovers was inspired by ancient Greek and Roman literature. She shared her analysis of the Iliad's portrayal of the relationship:

There is a lot of support for their relationship in the text of the Iliad itself, though Homer never makes it explicit. For me, the most compelling piece of evidence, aside from the depth of Achilles' grief, is how he grieves: Achilles refuses to burn Patroclus' body, insisting instead on keeping the corpse in his tent, where he constantly weeps and embraces it—despite the horrified reactions of those around him. That sense of physical devastation spoke deeply to me of a true and total intimacy between the two men.

==== Hades ====
In Supergiant Games' Hades (2020), Achilles and Patroclus are explicitly depicted as having been a romantic couple in life. With both men now dead, the protagonist has the option to help reunite them in the underworld through their interactions over the course of the game.

== Later interpretations ==
Commentators from the Classical period interpreted the relationship through the lens of their own cultures, just as post-classical writers did. Middle Ages writers on the classical tradition often cast Achilles as heterosexual and having an exemplary chaste friendship with Patroclus. Medieval Christian writers deliberately suppressed the homoerotic nuances of the figure.

Modern scholars have debated how the Iliad portrays the nature of Achilles' and Patroclus' relationship. Specific questions include whether the bond was homoerotic, included sexual intercourse, conformed to pederasty, or was a non-sexual friendship. Scholars have also debated whether some questions are even answerable, what types of evidence are appropriate, and what the norms and context of Homer's time would have been.

=== Initial scholarship ===
Angelo Poliziano was the first post-classical scholar to review the homoerotic tradition of the relationship between Achilles and Patroclus, and perhaps the first modern scholar to examine ancient portrayals of same-sex love. In his Miscellania from 1489, he devotes an essay to reviewing ancient authors' opinions on the relationship. He documents implicitly and explicitly sexual characterizations of the relationship, as well as the debate over the partners' pederastic roles. Modern classicist Shane Butler characterizes Poliziano's conclusion as a "deliberate tease" that avoids using the text of the Iliad to determine that one pederastic interpretation is correct over the other, leaving the question of roles unresolved.

John Addington Symonds, in his 1873–76 text Studies of the Greek Poets, argued that the love between Achilles and Patroclus was central to the plot of the Iliad. Symonds later described it as an idealized example of masculine love: “a powerful and masculine emotion, in which effeminacy had no part, and which by no means excluded the ordinary sexual feelings ... the tie was both more spiritual and more energetic than that which bound man to woman.” In this essay, he also described their bond as a "heroic friendship," and rejected the interpretation that their relationship was pederastic.

Saul Levin, in the 1949 article "Love and the Hero of the Iliad", states that their relationship was not pederastic, but that the relationship was more meaningful to Achilles than any love he could have for women, or his other familial relationships.

W. M. Clarke, in the 1978 article "Achilles and Patroclus in Love", argues that the pair are in love, in a homoerotic, and likely sexual, relationship. He rejects the notion that they just had a close friendship, and also says that the relationship does not align with pederasty. Clarke cites comparisons between their relationship and others in the Iliad, as well as how other characters describe the pair and how they describe each other. Clarke also uses comparative evidence from other literature and myths, especially on tropes of love, and dissects ancient commentary on the Iliad.

Bernard Sergent, in his 1986 Homosexuality in Greek Myth, stated that their relationship was definitely homophilic but not pederastic, and their relationship involved "an intensity of emotions between two men in an expression that surpasses what our own culture tolerates." Sergent does not comment on whether the pair had sex. According to William A. Percy III, other scholars also believe that in Homer's Ionian culture there existed a homosexuality that had not taken on the form it later would in pederasty.

=== 2000s scholarship ===
David Halperin argues that that Achilles and Patroclus had a non-sexual friendship within the Homeric Iliad. In One Hundred Years of Homosexuality, in an article reprinted at the beginning of Part 2, "Heroes and Their Pals," Halperin compares Homer's Achilles and Patroclus of the Iliad to the roughly contemporary traditions of Jonathan and David in the Hebrew Bible, and Gilgamesh and Enkidu in the Epic of Gilgamesh. He argues that while a modern reader is inclined to interpret the portrayal of these intense same-sex male warrior friendships as being fundamentally homoerotic, it is important to consider the greater themes of these relationships:

The thematic insistence on mutuality and the merging of individual identities, although it may invoke in the minds of modern readers the formulas of heterosexual romantic love [...] in fact situates avowals of reciprocal love between male friends in an honorable, even glamorous tradition of heroic comradeship: precisely by banishing any hint of subordination on the part of one friend to the other, and thus any suggestion of hierarchy, the emphasis on the fusion of two souls into one actually distances such a love from erotic passion.

According to Halperin, these distinctive masculine friendships, having no separate institutional social status at the time other than "battle companion," were represented by the poets of these works to their audiences through the device of using the familiar language and imagery of marital and familial relationships to emphasize their intensity. For example, in Book 19 of the Iliad Achilles mourns Patroclus (lines 315–337) in language very close to that used just previously by the woman Briseis (lines 287–300); also, Achilles' expressed desire in Book 16 (lines 97-100) to take Troy together with Patroclus alone, which language can be thought to have overtones of romantic love. Halperin emphasizes that later playwrights, authors, and readers of Homer hundreds of years later in the classical period (particularly 5th century BCE Athens), when romantic same-sex relationships between men were commonly seen in terms of contemporary assumptions about the institution of pederastic relationships, generally did attribute a sexual relationship to the fictional couple.

Classicists Victor Davis Hanson and John Heath argue that modern authors who identify the pair as homosexual ingeniously reinvent the Homeric text at will.

James Davidson, in the 2007 book The Greeks and Greek Love: a radical reappraisal of homosexuality in Ancient Greece, argues that the relationship between Achilles and Patroclus was homoerotic, and that the pair had a type of homosexual marriage.

Robin Lane Fox has written that "There is certainly no evidence in the text of the Iliad that Achilles and Patroclus were lovers. [...] Those contemporary critics who see all literary instances of male affection for males as proof of "repressed homosexuality" have the same problem as other conspiracy theorists: their hypothesis is invulnerable to disproof; we have no way of knowing if they are wrong".

Marco Fantuzzi, in the 2012 book Achilles in Love, argues that there was no homoerotic element to their relationship, and that they had a symbiotic bond, with Patroclus serving as Achilles' alter ego.

Shane Butler, in the 2016 book Deep Classics: Rethinking Classical Reception, disagrees with Fantuzzi and argues that the pair had a true love that naturally defied labels and explicit roles like those of pederasty. Butler says the best answer to defining their relationship is that they occupy all of the options: friends, battlefield-comrades, and lovers.

Celsiana Warwick argued in the 2019 article "We Two Alone: Conjugal Bonds and Homoerotic Subtext in the Iliad" that the relationship was homoerotic, taking the form of a conjugal bond rather than fitting into the norms of pederasty. Warwick argues that their bond, and that of Odysseus and Penelope, were presented by Homer as the ideal conjugal relationship, and that these ideals had subversive elements.

== See also ==
- David and Jonathan
- Homosexuality in ancient Greece
- Homosexuality in the militaries of ancient Greece
- Nisus and Euryalus
