= Patroclus =

Greek mythological character

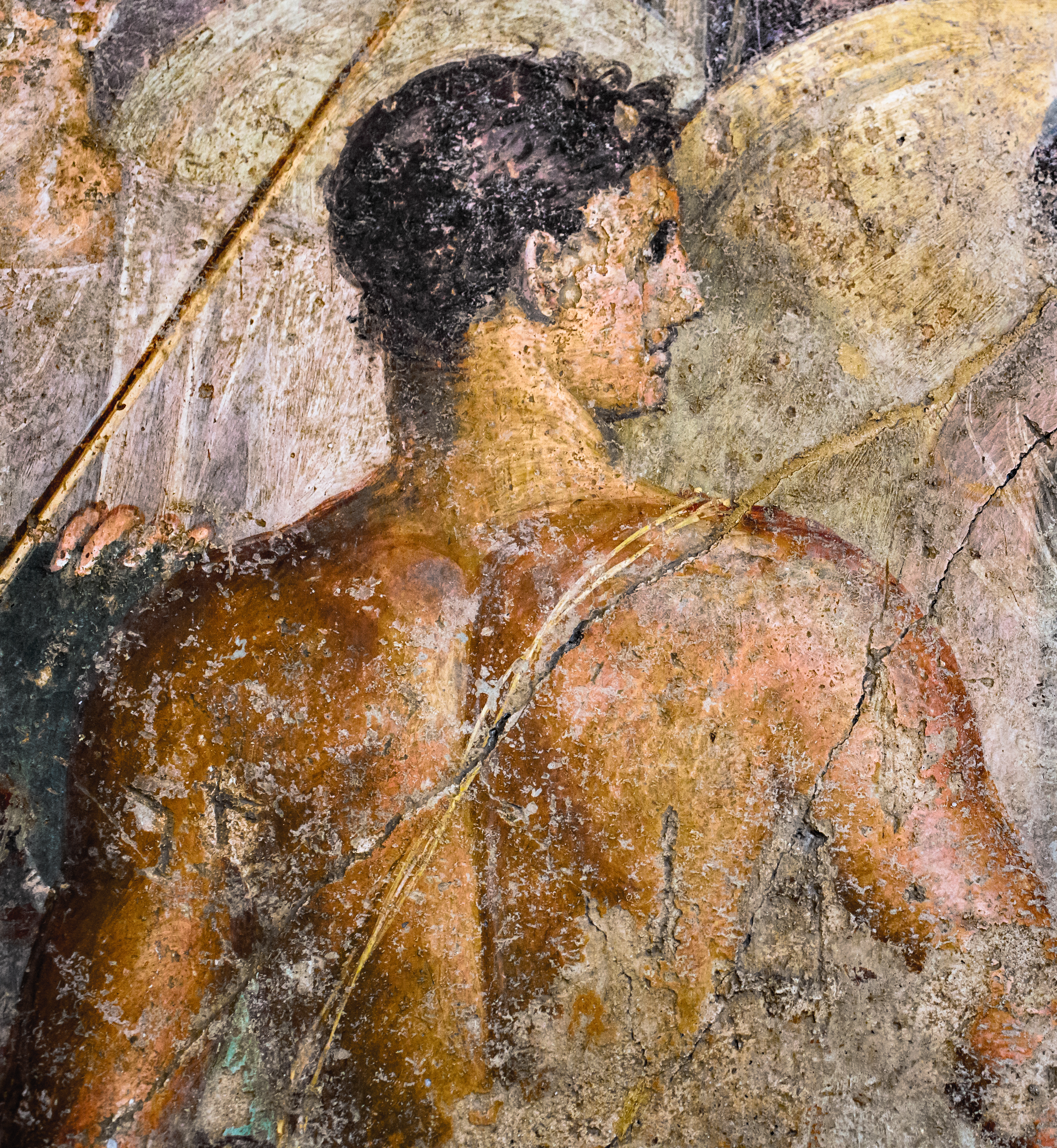
Patroclus on an antique fresco from the House of the Tragic Poet in Pompeii, 1st century AD (Naples National Archaeological Museum)

Patroclus (/pəˈtroʊkləs/; Ancient Greek: Πάτροκλος, romanized: Pátroklos, lit. 'glory of the father') was a Greek hero of the Trojan War and close companion of the hero Achilles in Greek mythology. Patroclus is an important character in Homer's Iliad. Although Homer does not describe Patroclus and Achilles as lovers, later ancient authors often interpreted their relationship in this manner.

Born in Opus, Patroclus was the son of the Argonaut Menoetius. When he was a child, he was exiled from his hometown and was adopted by Peleus, king of Phthia. There, he was raised alongside Peleus's son, Achilles. When the tide of the Trojan War turned against the Achaeans, Patroclus, disguised as Achilles and defying his orders to retreat in time, led the Myrmidons in battle against the Trojans and was eventually killed by the Trojan prince, Hector. Enraged by Patroclus's death, Achilles ended his refusal to fight, resulting in significant Greek victories.

== Name ==
The Latinized name Patroclus derives from the Ancient Greek Pátroklos (Πάτροκλος), meaning "glory of his father," from πατήρ (patḗr, "father" stem pátr-) and κλέος (kléos, "glory"). A variation of the name with the same components in different order is Kleópatros, while the feminine form of the name is Cleopatra.

There are at least three pronunciations of the name 'Patroclus' in English. Because the penultimate syllable is light in Latin prose (pă′.trŏ.clŭs), the antepenult was stressed in Latin and would normally be stressed in English as well, for /ˈpæt.rə.kləs/ (analogous to 'Sophocles'). However, this pronunciation is seldom encountered: for metrical convenience, Alexander Pope had made the 'o' long, and thus stressed, in his translation of Homer, following a convention of Greek and Latin verse, and that pronunciation – of Latin pa.trō′.clus – has stuck, for English /pəˈtroʊ.kləs/. Moreover, because in prose, a penultimate Greco-Latin short o (omicron) would only be stressed in a closed syllable, the penult has sometimes been misanalysed as being closed (*pă.trŏc′.lŭs), which would change the English o to a short vowel: /pəˈtrɒk.ləs/.

== Description and family ==
Philostratus wrote that Patroclus had "an olive complexion, black (melas) eyes, and sufficiently fine eyebrows, and he commended moderately long hair... His nose was straight, and he flared his nostrils as eager horses do." In the Latin account of Dares the Phrygian, Patroclus was illustrated as "... handsome and powerfully built. His eyes were [lively and large] (oculis vividis et magnis). He was modest, dependable, wise, a man richly endowed."

Patroclus was the son of Menoetius (hence called Menoetiades Μενοιτιάδης, meaning "son of Menoetius") by either Philomela or Polymele, Sthenele, or Periopis. His only sibling was Myrto, mother of Eucleia by Heracles. Homer also references Menoetius as the individual who gave Patroclus to Peleus. Menoetius was the son of Actor, king of Opus in Locris, by Aegina, daughter of Asopus.

Comparative table of Patroclus's family
Relation	Names	Sources										
Relation	Names	Homer			Pindar	Apollonius	Philocrates	Apollodorus	Plutarch	Hyginus	Eustathius	Tzetzes
Relation	Names	Iliad	Sch. Il.	Sch. Ody.	Scholia	Scholia	Philocrates	Apollodorus	Plutarch	Hyginus	Eustathius	Tzetzes
Parents	Menoetius	✓										
Parents	Menoetius and Sthenele		✓			✓		✓				
Parents	Menoetius and Philomela			✓						✓	✓	✓
Parents	Menoetius and Polymele						✓	✓				
Parents	Menoetius and Periopis							✓				
Sibling	Myrto								✓			

== Mythology ==
=== Early days ===
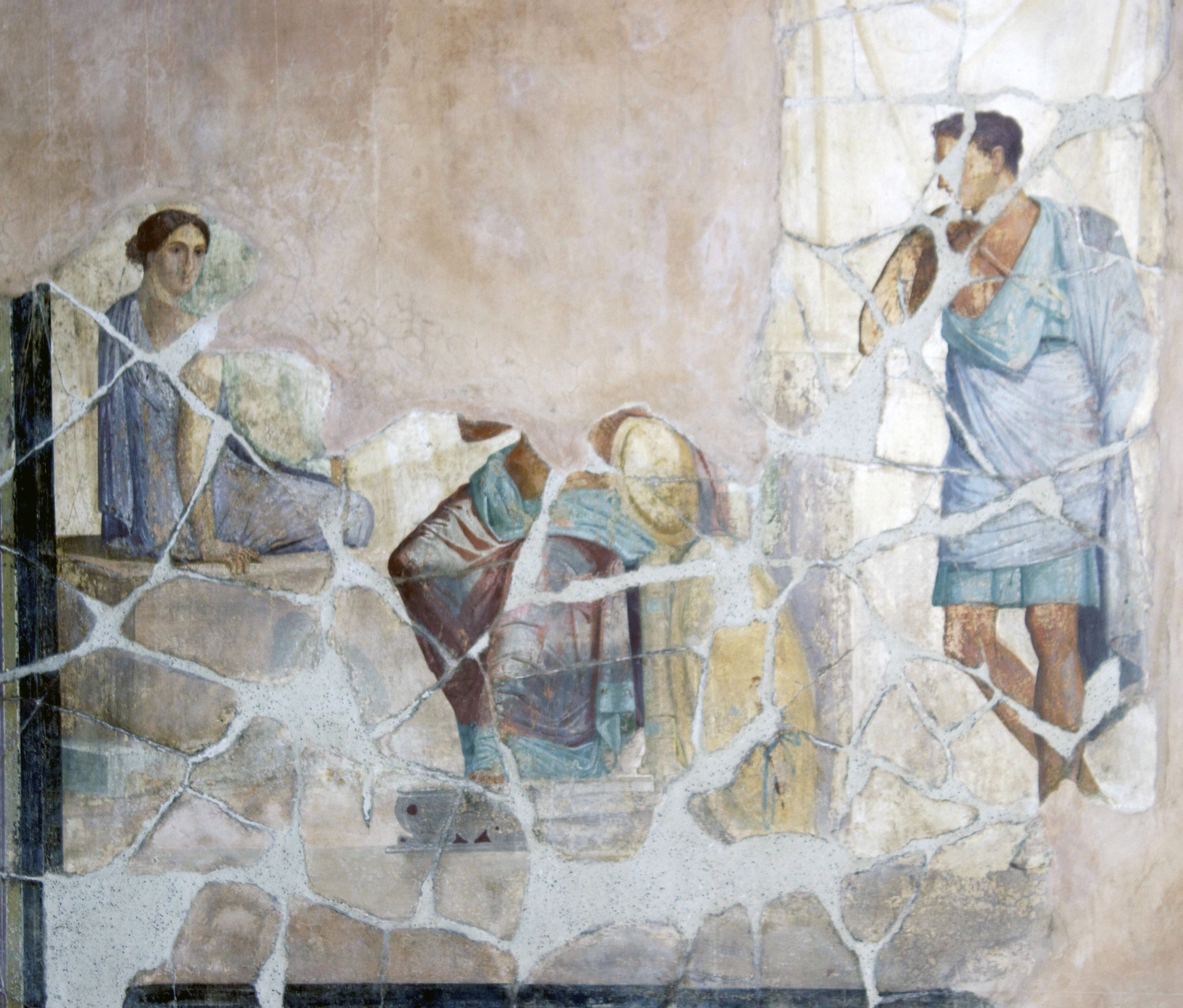
A fresco in Pompeii depicting Achilles seated between Briseis and Patroclus in the marquee

During his childhood, Patroclus had accidentally killed his playmate Clysonymus over a game of dice. As a result, he was exiled from his home, Opus, with Menoetius sending him to Peleus, king of Phthia and father of Achilles. Peleus named Patroclus Achilles's "squire", as they both grew up together and became close friends. Patroclus acted as a male role model for Achilles, being both kinder than him as well as wiser regarding counsel. (Note: Nestor, quoting Patroclus's father Menoetius, reminds Patroclus of his father's advice: "My child, in birth is Achilles nobler than thou, but thou art the elder though in might he is the better far. Yet do thou speak to him well a word of wisdom and give him counsel, and direct him; and he will obey thee to his profit.") Patroclus's early life, including his flight to the house of Peleus, is narrated later in the Iliad, when his ghost appears to Achilles reminding him about his past and giving him advice about his burial.

According to Photius, Ptolemy Hephaestion (probably referring to Ptolemy Chennus) wrote that Patroclus was also loved by the sea god Poseidon, who taught him the art of riding horses. He also states that Patroclus was monitored in his youth by a man named Eudorus.

Local tradition in Laconia held that Achilles killed Las when he came to their land to seek the hand of Helen, daughter of Tyndareus. However, the geographer Pausanias disagrees, stating that it was actually Patroclus who killed Las, arguing that Patroclus, not Achilles, was one of Helen's suitors.

=== Trojan War ===
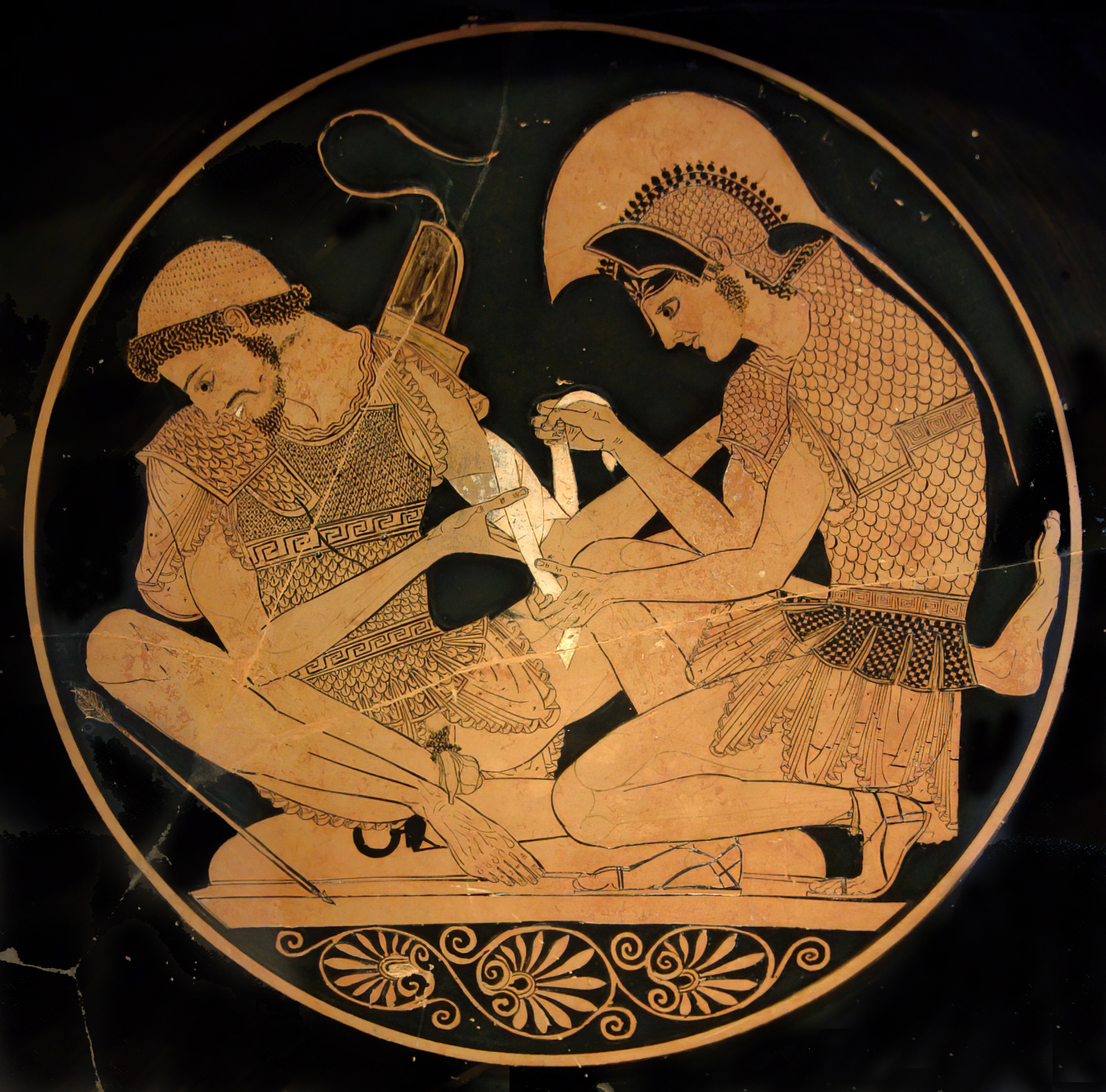
A cup depicting Achilles bandaging Patroclus's arm, by the Sosias Painter

According to the Iliad, when the tide of the Trojan War had turned against the Greeks and the Trojans were threatening their ships, Patroclus convinced Achilles to let him lead the Myrmidons into combat. Achilles consented, giving Patroclus the armor Achilles had received from his father in order for Patroclus to impersonate Achilles. Achilles then told Patroclus to return after beating the Trojans back from their ships.

Patroclus defied Achilles's order and pursued the Trojans back to the gates of Troy. Patroclus killed many Trojans and Trojan allies, including a son of Zeus, Sarpedon. While fighting, Patroclus's wits were removed by Apollo, after which the spear of Euphorbus hit Patroclus. Hector then kills Patroclus by stabbing him in the stomach with a spear.

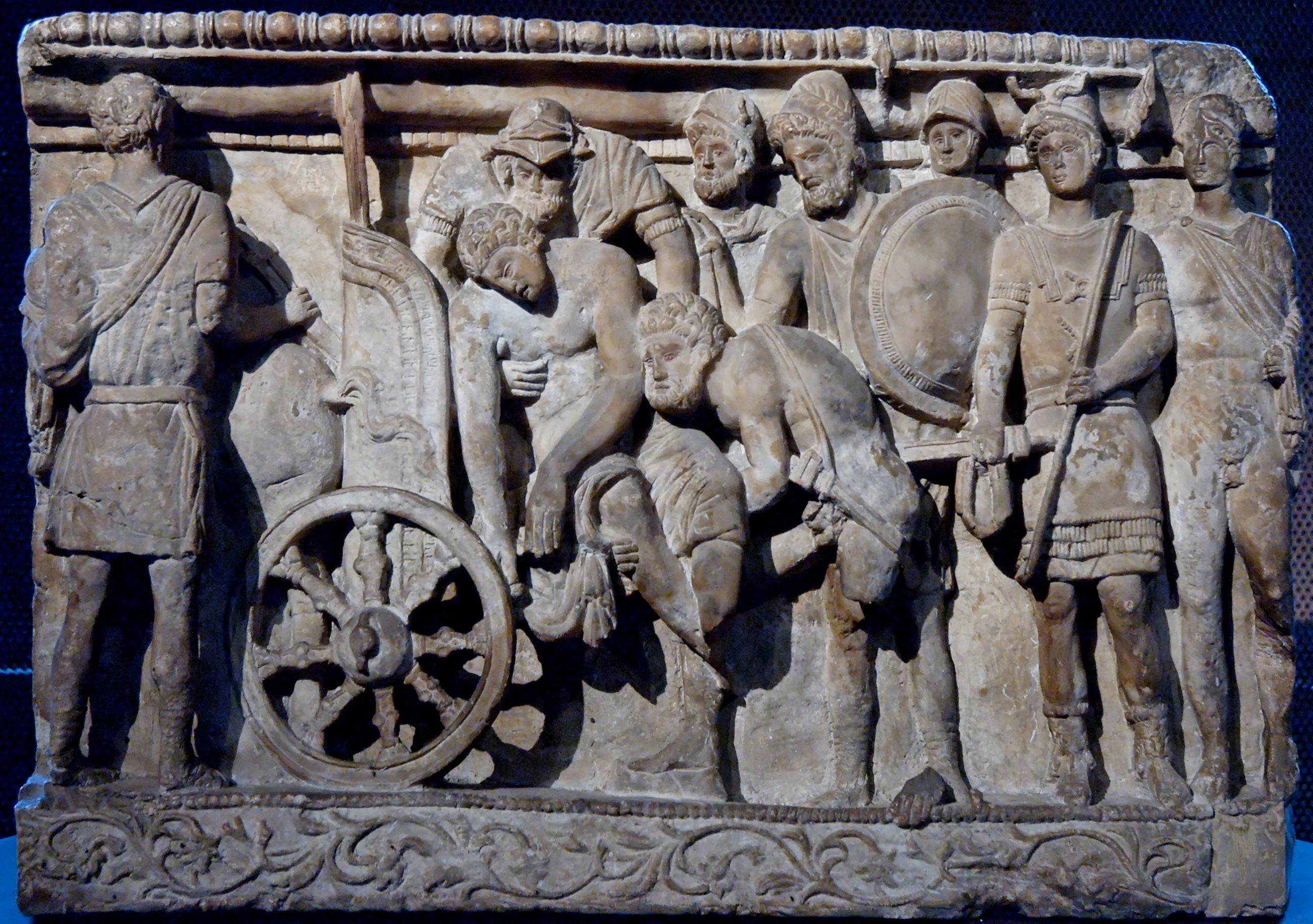
Menelaus and Meriones lift the body of Patroclus while Odysseus and others look on (Etruscan relief, 2nd century BC)

Achilles retrieved his body, which had been stripped of armor by Hector and protected on the battlefield by Menelaus and Ajax. Achilles did not allow the burial of Patroclus's body until the ghost of Patroclus appeared and demanded his burial in order to pass into Hades. Patroclus was then cremated on a funeral pyre, which was covered in the hair of his sorrowful companions. As the cutting of hair was a sign of grief while also acting as a sign of the separation of the living and the dead, this points to how well-liked Patroclus had been. The ashes of Achilles were said to have been buried in a golden urn along with those of Patroclus by the Hellespont.

== Relationship with Achilles ==
Although there is no explicit sexual relationship between Achilles and Patroclus in the Homeric tradition, a few later Greek authors wrote about what they saw as implied in the text regarding their relationship. Aeschylus and Phaedrus, for example, state there was a clear relationship between them. Aeschylus refers to Achilles as the erastes, while Phaedrus refers to Achilles as the eromenos of the relationship. Morales and Mariscal state, "There is a polemical tradition concerning the nature of the relationship between the two heroes."

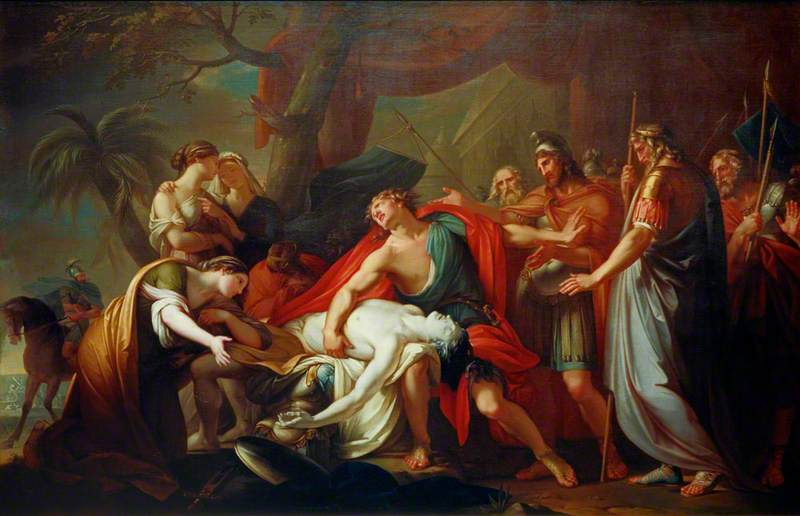
Achilles Lamenting the Death of Patroclus, Portrait by Gavin Hamilton. National Galleries of Scotland.

According to Ledbetter (1993), there is a train of thought that Patroclus could have been a representation of the compassionate side of Achilles, who was known for his rage, mentioned in the first line of Homer's Iliad. Ledbetter connects the way that Achilles and his mother, Thetis, communicate to the link between Achilles and Patroclus. Ledbetter does so by comparing how Thetis comforts the weeping Achilles in Book 1 of the Iliad to how Achilles comforts Patroclus as he weeps in Book 16. Achilles uses a simile containing a young girl tearfully looking at her mother to complete the comparison. Ledbetter believes this puts Patroclus into a subordinate role to that of Achilles. However, as Patroclus is explicitly stated to be the elder of the two characters, this is not evidence of their ages or social relation to each other.

James Hooker describes the literary reasons for Patroclus's character within the Iliad. He states that another character could have filled the role of confidant for Achilles and that it was only through Patroclus that we have a worthy reason for Achilles's wrath. Hooker claims that without the death of Patroclus, an event that weighed heavily upon him, Achilles's following act of compliance to fight would have disrupted the balance of the Iliad.

Hooker describes the necessity of Patroclus sharing a deep affection with Achilles within the Iliad. According to his theory, this affection allows an even more profound tragedy to occur. Hooker argues that the greater the love, the greater the loss. Hooker continues to negate Ledbetter's theory that Patroclus is in some way a surrogate for Achilles; rather, Hooker views Patroclus's character as a counterpart to that of Achilles. Hooker reminds us that it is Patroclus who pushes the Trojans back, which Hooker claims makes Patroclus a hero, as well as foreshadowing what Achilles is to do.

Achilles and Patroclus grew up together after Menoitios gave Patroclus to Achilles's father, Peleus. During this time, Peleus made Patroclus one of Achilles's "henchmen." While Homer's Iliad never explicitly stated that Achilles and Patroclus were lovers, this concept was propounded by some later authors. (Note: As Martin (2012), argues, "The ancient sources do not report, however, what modern scholars have asserted: that Alexander and his very close friend Hephaestion were lovers. Achilles and his equally close friend Patroclus provided the legendary model for this friendship, but Homer in the Iliad never suggested that they had sex with each other. (That came from later authors.) If Alexander and Hephaestion did have a sexual relationship, it would have been transgressive by majority Greek standards ...")

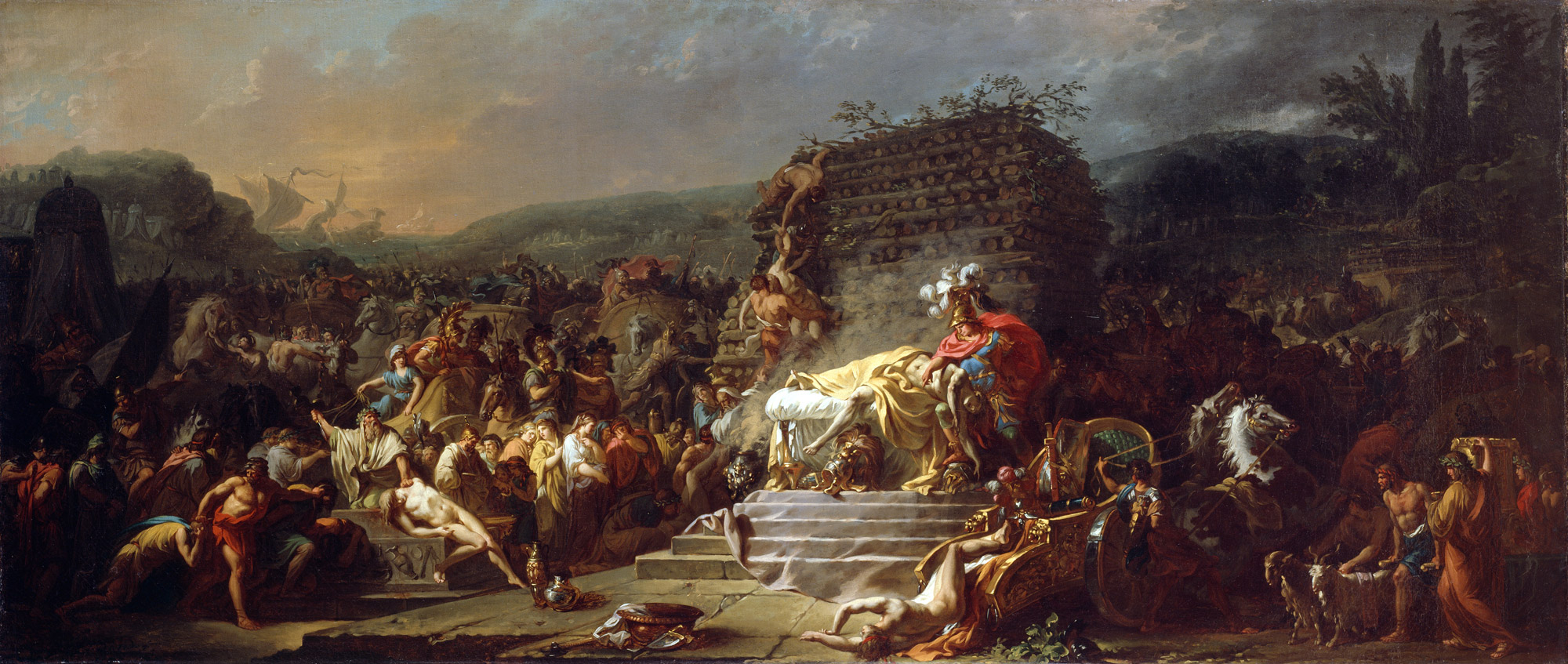
The Funeral of Patroclus by Jacques-Louis David, 1778.

Aeschines asserts that there was no need to explicitly state the relationship as a romantic one, for such "is manifest to such of his hearers as are educated men." In later Greek writings, such as Plato's Symposium, the relationship between Patroclus and Achilles is discussed as a model of romantic love. However, Xenophon, in his Symposium, had Socrates argue that it was inaccurate to label their relationship as romantic. Nevertheless, their relationship is said to have inspired Alexander the Great in his own close relationship with his life-long companion Hephaestion.

In the Iliad, Achilles was younger than Patroclus. (Note: Plato in his Symposium has one of his characters say that Achilles was "much the younger, by Homer's account".) This reinforces Dowden's explanation of the relationship between an eromenos, a youth in transition, and an erastes, an older male who had recently made the same transition. Dowden also notes the common occurrence of such relationships as a form of initiation. However, Statius in the Achilleid states that the two were either within the same age group or acted as if they were.

Patroclus is a character in William Shakespeare's play Troilus and Cressida. In the play, Achilles, who has become lazy, is besotted with Patroclus, and the other characters complain that Achilles and Patroclus are too busy having sex to fight in the war.

== Achilles and Patroclus in classical literature ==
- Homer, Iliad, 9.308, 16.2, 11.780, 23.54 (700 BC)
- Pindar, Olympian Odes, IX (476 BC)
- Aeschylus, Myrmidons, F135-36 (495 BC)
- Euripides, Iphigenia in Aulis, (405 BC);
- Plato, Symposium, 179e (388-367 BC)
- Statius, Achilleid, 161, 174, 182 (96 AD)

== Bibliography ==
- Apollodorus, Apollodorus, The Library, with an English Translation by Sir James George Frazer, F.B.A., F.R.S. in 2 Volumes, Cambridge, Massachusetts, Harvard University Press; London, William Heinemann Ltd., 1921. ISBN 0-674-99135-4. Online version at the Perseus Digital Library.
- Homer, The Iliad with an English Translation by A.T. Murray, Ph.D. in two volumes. Cambridge, Massachusetts, Harvard University Press; London, William Heinemann, Ltd., 1924. Online version at the Perseus Digital Library.
- Plato (1925). Symposium. Plato in Twelve Volumes. Vol. 9. Translated by Fowler, Harold N. Cambridge, MA; London, UK: Harvard University Press; William Heinemann Ltd."Online version". Perseus Digital Library.
- Tzetzes, John, Allegories of the Iliad translated by Goldwyn, Adam J. and Kokkini, Dimitra. Dumbarton Oaks Medieval Library, Harvard University Press, 2015. ISBN 978-0-674-96785-4
- Lattimore, Richmond (2011) [1951]. The Iliad of Homer. with new Introduction and Notes by Richard Martin. Chicago: The University of Chicago Press. ISBN 9780226470498.
