= Philomela (mother of Patroclus) =

Greek mythological figure

In Greek mythology, Philomela (/ˌfɪləˈmiːlə/; Ancient Greek: Φιλομήλα, romanized: Philomḗla, lit. 'lover of song' or 'lover of melody') was the wife of Menoetius and mother of Patroclus. The former was one of the Argonauts and the latter a participant of the Trojan War. However, the Bibliotheca listed three other wives of Menoetius and possible mothers of Patroclus include Periopis, Polymele, and Sthenele.
