= Eucleia =

Greek mythological figure

In Ancient Greek Religion, Eucleia or Eukleia (Ancient Greek: Ευκλεία, lit. 'Good Repute') was the name of a goddess and epithet of Artemis. The exact relationship between the two is unclear. The month name Eucleios derives from the goddess's name.

== Goddess ==
There is no mention of Eucleia in Hesiod's Theogony, and no early genealogy is known for the goddess. However, a fragment of Euripides suggests that as a personified abstraction Eucleia was, by the fifth century BC at least, considered to be the daughter of another personified abstraction Ponos (Toil).

In Athens, Eucleia was a personified abstraction, representing good reputation and glory. She shared a common Athenian sanctuary and priest with another personified abstraction Eunomia (Good Order). Their common priest also served as the cosmetes, the official who was responsible for the training of Athens' young military cadets, the ephebes. Roland Hampe has argued that the cosmetes was probably also responsible for moral supervision of the Athenian young women. The geographer Pausanias reports that a sanctuary of Eucleia (with no mention of Eunomia) was set up in or near the Athenian market as a thank-offering for the victory at Marathon (490 BC). The Greek lyric poet Bacchylides, in Ode 13 (c. 485-483 BC), also associates Eucleia with Eunomia on the island of Aegina, as one of the protectors of the state (polis), saying that Arete (Excellence) "guides the state with garland-loving Eucleia, and sound-minded Eunomia". A reserved seat inscription for Eucleia and Eunomia's common priest at Athen's Theater of Dionysus, attests to their cult association during the Roman imperial period.

The name "Eucleia", in reference to a goddess, was widespread. In addition to the Athenian personified abstraction, there are also references to a goddess Eucleia in Boetia, Locris, Corinth, and Delphi. According to Plutarch, although Eucleia was generally regarded as the same as Artemis, others said she was a daughter of Heracles and Myrto, and that she died a virgin and was worshipped among the Boeotians and the Locrians:

Eucleia religious festivals were celebrated in Corinth, and Delphi. The Corinthian festival was multi-day and hence of some importance. According to Xenophon, a "sacrilegious" mass murder took place in the Corinthian market place on "the last day" of the Eucleia festival. The Eucleia at Delphi was an important festival for the Labyads who offered sacrifices at the festival for newlyweds and newborns that were being initiated into the family. From the festival name comes Eucleios, the name of a month for several, particularly Doric, communities, such as Corfu, Astypalaia, Byzantium, and Taormina. In Paros and Epiros, military generals (stratêgoi) offered dedications to Eucleia along with Aphrodite, Zeus Aphrodisios, Hermes, and Artemis.

The connection between the Eucleia paired with Eunomia at Athens, and the Eucleia of Boetia and elsewhere is unclear. Martin P. Nilsson saw little connection between what he calls this Locrian-Boeotian-Corinthian wedding goddess (Hochzeitsgöttin), and the Eucleia at Athens, other than a shared name. That the temple of Eucleia at Athens was set up as a thank-offering, "indicates a different sort of cult" than the one in Boeotia.

== Epithet of Artemis ==
The name Eucleia was also used as an epithet and cult name of Artemis. Which of the above mentions of a goddess Eucleia are meant as references to Artemis, rather than an independent goddess, as well as, whether Eucleia was originally an epithet of Artemis who became an independent goddess, or an independent goddess who became equated with Artemis is unclear.

At the time Plutarch is writing (c. 100 AD), he can say that "Eucleia is regarded by most as Artemis". However the association of Artemis with the name Eucleia occurs as early as Sophocles's Oedipus Rex (c. 429 BC), where the chorus calls Artemis "eucleia":

On you first I call, daughter of Zeus, immortal Athena, and I implore your sister who protects the land, Artemis, seated on her round throne, far-famed [εὐκλέα], in the market-place,

— Sophocles, Oedipus Rex; translation by Hugh Lloyd-Jones

That an Athenian playwright can make such an association, and expect to be understood, provides evidence of the antiquity of the identification and the general spread of the cult.

Apparently the cult of Eucleia Artemis was particularly popular in Boetia. Both Plutarch and Pausanias mention cult sites of "Eucleia Artemis" located in Boetia. According to Pausanias, there was a temple of Eucleia Artemis at Thebes, which had a cult statue by the fourth-century BC sculptor Skopas, while according to Plutarch there was a sanctuary of Eucleia Artemis at Boeotian Plataea.

Sophocles has Eucleia Artemis "seated on her round throne" in Thebes' market-place (agora), where Pausanias says her temple was located, and apparently it was common throughout Boetia to locate her cult sites in the city market. According to Plutarch, Eucleia Artemis "has an altar and an image built in every market place" in Boetia (and Locris). Corinth also apparently held its Eucleia festival in its market place (from Xenophon, see above) where her cult site would then also have been located.

The only known cult customs are sacrifices involving marriage and childbirth. According to Plutarch, couples made offerings to Eucleia before a wedding, and according to the Labyad inscription, the Labyads sacrificed to her for newlyweds and newborns. There also seems to have been a tradition of honoring local heroes by burying them in the sanctuary of Eucleia Artemis. Cults of Eucleia Artemis have been assumed wherever Eucleia festivals were celebrated, or the month name Eucleios was in use.

There are similarities between Artemis and the Eucleia of Boetia and elsewhere. Both are associated with the protection of the family, as well as the state. Like Eucleia, Artemis was associated with childbirth and the care of the young, and there may also have been cult customs related to marriage and childbirth for Artemis similar to those mentioned above for Eucleia. And like Eucleia, who according to the Bacchylides quote above, was a protector of the state, so too Artemis Agoraea. Scholars have suggested that such similarities could account for the identification of the two.

According to Martin P. Nilsson, this wedding goddess Eucleia ought to be regarded as an epithet of Artemis which eventually became an independent goddess. However, Roland Hampe saw Eucleia as originally an independent goddess who eventually became identified with Artemis.

== Sanctuary at Aegae ==
There was a sanctuary of Eucleia at Aigai (Aegae), the ancient capital of Macedonia (located at modern Vergina). The sanctuary consisted of a 4th-century BC Doric temple, a small Hellenistic era temple, and two stoas. It was located in a public area of the ancient city, just to the north of the palace and theater, presumed to be the city's agora. In the vicinity of the sanctuary, two marble statue bases have been found, which have inscriptions that indicate they supported dedicatory statues of Eucleia, one perhaps life-size or larger, the other smaller than life-size. The statues were dedications to the goddess set up by Eurydice, paternal grandmother of Alexander the Great. In the area surrounding the sanctuary, three burials of significant people, one of whom was crowned with a golden oak leaf wreathe, have been discovered.

== Iconography ==
The time during and immediately after the Peloponnesian War (431–404 BC), was a popular period in Athens for the depiction of personifications on vases, with Eucleia being one of the most popular of these. Eucleia appears on numerous late fifth century BC Athenian vases, especially by the Meidias Painter and his circle of followers. She is depicted as a beautiful young woman wearing a peplos (or less commonly a chiton), sometimes holding branches for wreaths, consistent with Bacchylides's "garland loving Eucleia", or boxes, perhaps indicating the hope chest, or bridal chest which might be found in a women's quarters.

These vases are among a significant type of vase popular at Athens during this period: vases associated with weddings, where Eucleia represented a good reputation as one of the desired virtues for a happy marriage. Eucleia is often shown (usually with Eunomia) among the several goddesses in the retinue of Aphrodite Pandemos (Aphrodite of all the People). These goddesses are a collection of personified abstractions representing virtues such as Eucleia (Good Repute), Eunomia (Good Order), Peitho (Persuasion), and Harmonia (Harmony), as well as the benefits that might result from such virtues: Eudaimonia (Happiness), Eutychia (Prosperity), Hygieia (Health), and Paideia (Childrearing). These virtues were applied both to the private and public realms. They could be virtues of a person or a polis (city), and so could be thought of as both personal and civic virtues. In contrast to the turmoil of the Peloponnesian War and Athens' subsequent defeat, such depictions represented idealized images of a happy and well-ordered state of affairs, both in the home and the polis.
