= Ceuthonymus =

Daimon in Ancient Greek mythology

Ceuthonymus or Keuthonymos (Ancient Greek: Κευθώνυμος) is a spirit in Greek mythology who is the father of Menoites (or Menoetes, Menoetius). Ceuthonymus is a mysterious daimon or spirit of the underworld, who lives in the realm of Hades.
