= Myrto (mythology) =

Women in Greek mythology

In Greek mythology, the name Myrto (Ancient Greek: Μυρτώ, romanized: Murtṓ, lit. 'myrtle') may refer to one of the following characters:

- Myrto, a possible eponym for the Myrtoan Sea.
- Myrto, one of the Maenads who followed Dionysus in the Indian War.
- Myrto, an Amazon and one of the possible mothers of Myrtilus by Hermes.
- Myrto, daughter of Menoetius of Opus, sister to Patroclus. She had a daughter Eucleia by Heracles.
