= Menoetius =

Disambiguation link for various Greek mythological figures

Menoetius or Menoetes (/məˈniːʃiəs/; Ancient Greek: Μενοίτιος or Μενοίτης, romanized: Menoítios or Menoetius, lit. 'doomed might' ) was a name that refers to three distinct persons from Greek mythology:

- Menoetius, a second generation Titan, son of Iapetus and Clymene or Asia, and a brother of Atlas, Prometheus and Epimetheus. Menoetius was killed by Zeus with a flash of lightning in the Titanomachy, and banished to Tartarus. His name means "doomed might", deriving from the Ancient Greek words menos ("might, power") and oitos ("doom, pain"). Hesiod described Menoetius as hubristic, meaning exceedingly prideful and impetuous to the very end. From what his name suggests, along with Hesiod's own account, Menoetius was perhaps the Titan god of violent anger and rash action.
- Menoetes, guard of the cattle of Hades. During Heracles' twelfth labor, which required him to steal the hound Cerberus from the Underworld, he slays one of Hades' cattle. A certain Menoetes, son of Keuthonymos, challenges Heracles to a wrestling match, during which Heracles hugs him and breaks his ribs before Persephone intervenes.
- Menoetius from Opus was one of the Argonauts, and son of Actor and Aegina. He was the father of Patroclus and Myrto by either Sthenele, Philomela Polymele, or Periopis. Among the settlers of Locris, Menoetius was chiefly honored by King Opus II, son of Zeus and Protogeneia.
