= Autolycus of Athens =

5th-century BC Athenian athlete

Autolycus (Ancient Greek: Αὐτόλυκος; fl. 5th century BC), son of Lykon, was a young Athenian athlete of singular beauty and the lover of Callias. It is in honour of a victory gained by him in the pentathlon at the Panathenaic Games that Callias gives the banquet for him described by Xenophon in his Symposium.

After the defeat of Athens in the Peloponnesian Wars at the hands of Lysander, Autolycus defeated the Spartan-appointed governor Callibius by "tripping up his heels and throwing him to the ground". Callibius in turn hit Autolycus with his staff upon which Callibius was scolded by Lysander who told him that he "didn't know how to govern free men". Puppets of Lysander and the Spartans killed Autolycus soon after to appease Callibius.
