= Stele of the Labyadai =

Stele discovered in Delphi in 1893

The Stele of the Labyadai is a stele found at Delphi, written on all four sides. Its inscription is called the Labyad (or Labyadai) inscription, and seems to have regulated the phratry of the Labyads.

== Description ==
In 1893, slightly after the beginning of the great Excavations at Delphi, a stele with a rectangular plan, which was inscribed on all four sides, was discovered. The director of excavations Théophile Homolle was the first to study the inscription and concluded that it contained a series of rules concerning the normal function and internal relations of a phratry, named the Labyadai. For years the stele remained literally in the shadows, but its transferral to the Epigraphic Portico in the Delphi Museum revived scholarly interest as researchers could now read it more easily. Several questions were raised at this point, such as whether the Labyadai actually constituted a phratry, as they are nowhere referred to as such. However, a reference in the text to "Poseidon Phratrios" continues to support the phratry theory. The inscription dates to the late classical period. There is a lengthy discussion of funerary rituals, where it is stated, among other things, that the deceased should be accompanied in utmost quietness, without lamentations.

== Bibliography ==
- P.J. Rhodes & R. Osborne, Greek Historical Inscriptions, 404-323 BC. Oxford University Press: 2003. pp. 2-12.
