= Callias III =

4th-century BC Athenian aristocrat and politician

Callias (Greek: Kαλλίας, known as Callias III to distinguish him from his grandfather and great-great-grandfather) was an ancient Athenian aristocrat and political figure. He was the son of Hipponicus and an unnamed woman (she had previously married Pericles), an Alcmaeonid and the third member of one of the most distinguished Athenian families to bear the name of Callias. He was regarded as infamous for his extravagance and profligacy.

He apparently inherited his family's fortune in 424 BC. In 371 BC, he was one of the Athenian envoys sent to Sparta to negotiate peace. He is said to have spent his family's enormous wealth on sophists, flatterers, and women, and to have died in poverty. He is a character in several Socratic dialogues: Plato's Protagoras and Xenophon's Symposium are set at his house, and he featured in Aeschines of Sphettus's lost Aspasia.

== Life ==
Callias' family was unusually wealthy: the major part of their fortune came from the leasing of large numbers of slaves to the state-owned silver mines of Laurium. In return, the Calliai were paid a share of the mine proceeds, in silver. Accordingly, they were considered the richest family in Athens and quite possibly in all of Greece, and the head of the family was often simply referred to as "ho plousios" (Greek: "ὁ πλούσιος", "the wealthy"). The only other family that could rival their wealth were the tyrants of Syracuse.

Callias must have inherited the family's fortune in 424 BC, which can be reconciled with the mention of him in the comedy the Flatterers of Eupolis, 421 BC, as having recently entered into his inheritance. In 400 BC, he was involved in an attempt to destroy the career of the Attic orator, Andocides, by charging him with profanity in having placed a supplicatory bough on the altar of the temple at Eleusis during the celebration of the Mysteries. However, according to Andocides, the bough was actually placed there by Callias himself.

In 392 BC, he was placed in command of the Athenian heavy-armed troops at Corinth on the occasion of their defeat of a Spartan regiment, or Mora, by Iphicrates. Callias was hereditary proxenus (roughly the equivalent of the modern consul) to Sparta, and, as such, was chosen as one of the envoys empowered to negotiate a peace with Sparta in 371 BC. On this occasion Xenophon reports that Callias gave an absurd and self-glorifying speech.

It is said that Callias dissipated all his inherited wealth on sophists, flatterers, and women. These behaviours became quite evident early in his life so that he was commonly spoken of, before his father's death, being the "evil genius" of his family. He is acclaimed in Plato's Apology as having "paid more money to sophists than all the others."

The scene of Xenophon's Symposium, and also that of Plato's Protagoras, is set at Callias' house during a banquet hosted by him for his beloved Autolykos in honour of a victory gained by the handsome young man in the pentathlon at the Panathenaic Games. In the latter especially Callias' character is drawn with some vivid sketches as a dilettante highly amused with the intellectual fencing of Protagoras and Socrates. Callias III is also an interlocutor with Socrates in Aeschines of Sphettus' dialogue, Aspasia.

Callias is said to have ultimately reduced himself to absolute beggary, to which the sarcasm of Iphicrates in calling him metragyrtes instead of daduchos refers. Callias died so poor that he could not afford the common necessities of life. He left a legitimate son named Hipponicus.

== See also ==
- List of speakers in Plato's dialogues
- Pederasty in ancient Greece
