= Ian David Lewis Michael =

Ian David Lewis Michael (26 May 1936 – 26 November 2020) was a British academic and crime novelist. A Hispanist, he also wrote crime novels under the pseudonym of David Serafín.
