= Symposium (Xenophon) =

Socratic dialogue written c.363 BCE

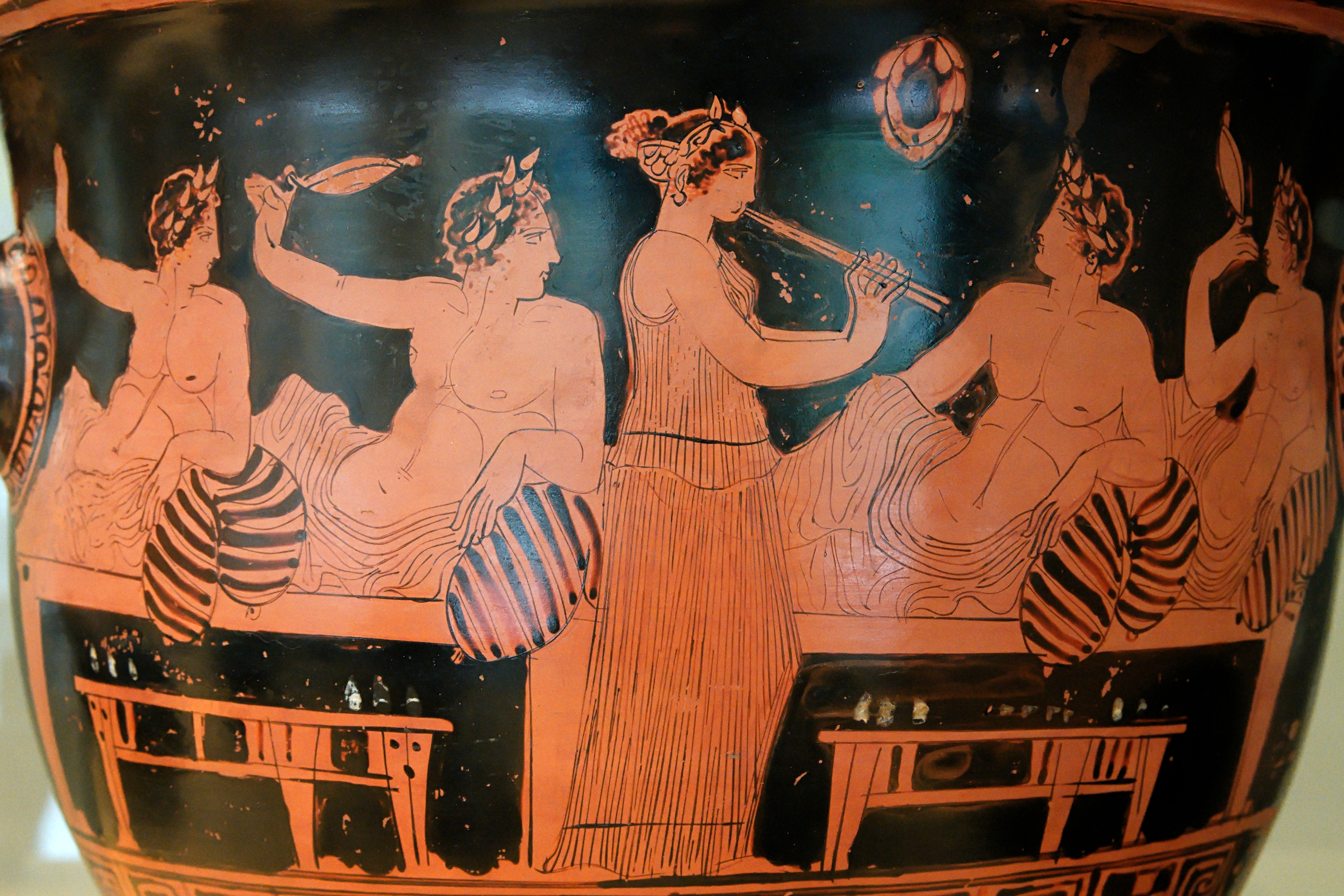
A female aulos-player entertains men at a symposium on this Attic red-figure

The Symposium (Ancient Greek: Συμπόσιον) is a Socratic dialogue written by Xenophon in the late 360s B.C. In it, Socrates and a few of his companions attend a symposium (a dinner party at which Greek aristocrats could enjoy entertainment and discussion) hosted by Kallias for the young man Autolykos. Xenophon claims that he was present at the symposium, although this is disputed because he would have been too young to attend. The dramatic date for the Symposium is 422 B.C.

Entertainment at the dinner is provided by the Syracusan and his three performers. Their feats of skill thrill the attendants and serve as points of conversation throughout the dialogue. Much of the discussion centers on what each guest is most proud of. All their answers are playful or paradoxical: Socrates, for one, prides himself on his knowledge of the art of match-making.

Major themes of the work include beauty and desire, wisdom, virtue, and laughter which is evoked by Philippos the jester and the jocular discourse of the dinner guests. Xenophon demonstrates clever, intelligent, and reasoned use of playfulness (paidia παιδία) and seriousness (spoude σπουδή) to manipulate the discussion of the above-mentioned themes in a manner appropriate to a symposium.

== Dramatis Personae ==
Xenophon consciously and carefully chooses his characters in this dialogue. Those who attend the symposium (422 B.C.) are all gentlemen (kaloikagathoi) and are united by their status. Later, however, their disagreements will lead them to conflict. The contemporary readers of the Symposium would have been familiar with each character's history, and would have recognized the ironic circumstances of the dialogue.

Socrates: The main character in the work. Socrates drives and controls the conversation at the symposium. He values the craft of match-making because a good match-maker can arrange suitable marriages and friendship between cities.

Kallias: An exceptionally rich Athenian who has paid much money to sophists for his “wisdom.” He is the host of the Symposium for Autolykos whom he is in heavenly(chaste) love with . He is proud of his ability to make other men better. He does this by giving them money, although in the dialogue it is revealed that this makes them just toward everyone but Kallias.

Antisthenes: A prominent Socratic writer on whose works scholars believe Xenophon relies in part. He is one of Socrates’ companions who attends the symposium. He values his wealth because, although he has only a little, it is enough to satisfy his needs and it affords him leisure which allows him to spend time with Socrates.

Autolykos: The young winner of the pankration whom Kallias invites, along with his father Lykon, to the symposium as his guests of honor. He is most proud of his father.

Lykon: The father of Autolykos. Commentators identify this Lycon as one of Socrates' prosecutors at his trial in 399 B.C. When asked, he says he is most proud of his son, and is demonstrated to be the wealthiest man in the world because he would not give up Autolykos for all the Great King's wealth (3.13).

Kritoboulos: He was sent to Socrates by his father for protection (4.24). Kritoboulos values his beauty because it encourages men toward all forms of virtue, not just justice.

Charmides: He values his poverty because he does not have to worry about losing his possessions and he lives at the expense of the state. Charmides was one of the Thirty who were responsible for the deaths of Autolykos and Nikeratos.

Nikeratos: Son of the most prominent general in Athens. He is later killed by the Thirty. Nikeratos is proud of his ability to recite all of Homer's Iliad and Odyssey, though he is not able to prove that this skill should be valued. He is also portrayed as a very greedy man (4.45).

Hermogenes: One of Socrates’ companions, he is an extremely pious man and values the gods' favor.

Syracusan and performers: A group hired by Kallias to perform at his symposium for the entertainment of the guests. The skill of the Syracusan in training his slave performers is much admired by Socrates, and the performances serve as points of conversation throughout the dialogue.

Philippos the Jester: Arrives uninvited during the symposium and distracts everyone from their fascination with the beauty of Autolykos. He tries twice to elicit laughter in the guests, and only when he weeps at his failure does Kritoboulos begin laughing. Philippos contrasts with Socrates, who is easily able to make the guests laugh.

== Plot summary ==
=== Chapter 1 ===
Xenophon begins the dialogue by saying that he thinks the deeds of men not only in their serious times, but also in their playful times, are worth mentioning. He expresses his desire to explain the deeds on such a particular occasion, at which he himself was present (Xenophon's presence at the symposium is doubted, since he would have been too young to attend at the time).

After this preface, the dialogue proper begins. The Panathenaic Games are underway and Kallias is returning with Autolykos, the recent victor in the young men's pankration, from a horse race that they had just watched. Nikeratos and Lykon are also present. They are on their way to Kallias' house in the Piraeus when they come across Socrates and a few of his companions including Kritoboulos, Hermogenes, Antisthenes and Charmides. Kallias asks them all to join him at a symposium which he is hosting for Autolykos and his father, Lykon. Kallias promises to show them that he has become a man of much consequence, although he had kept the others ignorant of his ability to say many wise things. They politely decline at first, but ultimately accept the offer because Kallias' feelings seem hurt. They all go off, some to exercise, others to bathe in addition, and later reconvene at Kallias' house(1.7).

When they all sat down, each of them was struck by the beauty of Autolykos, being as it was combined with bashfulness and moderation. Each onlooker was struck differently by the boy's beauty. Some grew quiet, others struck some kind of pose. Kallias was almost as worth looking at since he was possessed by Eros, the god of sober love. They would all have eaten in near perfect silence if it were not for the sudden appearance of the uninvited jester, Philippos(1.11). His arrival sparks some conversation. Philippos tries twice to make the group laugh, but fails. Only when he weeps at his failure does Kritoboulos laugh(1.16).

=== Chapter 2 ===
After they finished eating, an entertainer from Syracuse, who had been invited by Kallias, came with his entourage of performers including a girl good at flute playing, a girl who danced spectacularly, and a very pretty boy who played the cithara and danced 2.1). The flute player and the boy play their instruments together in a performance which pleases Socrates. He praises Kallias for the dinner and the entertainment which he provided. Kallias then suggests that the party should enjoy some perfumes, but Socrates refused, saying that men ought to smell of gymnastic exercise and the men with whom they associate. This leads to a discussion of the teachability of virtue (2.6), which Socrates suggests they drop because it is controversial. The dancing girl is about to perform with the flutist (2.7).

The performance is quite remarkable and causes Socrates to note that the female nature is not inferior to the male, except in judgment and physical strength, and so each man should teach his wife whatever he wants her to know(2.9). At this, Antisthenes asked Socrates why he had not educated his wife, Xanthippe, but lives with her, a most difficult companion. Socrates replies, saying that he acts much like one seeking to become an expert horseman who believes that if they can tame the most high-spirited horses, they could easily manage any other. Socrates deals with humans, so if he can deal with the most difficult of them, no others should give him trouble (2.10). Next the acrobatic girl alone performed a dangerous act which caused the audience to fear for her. After this act Socrates addresses Antisthenes, saying that manliness (andreia) is teachable even to women (2.12). Antisthenes then remarked that the Syracusan could charge money to make all the Athenians, including their women, fearless in battle. Philippos the jester interrupts, amused by the possibility that even cowardly men be taught manliness (2.14). No one laughs at this joke.

When the boy dances, Socrates remarks on how his beauty seems greater when dancing than when at rest. He admits his willingness to learn the poses from him because he wishes to dance(2.16). At this everyone laughs, and it is apparent that Socrates can easily make the party laugh while Philippos cannot. Socrates says that Charmides had caught him dancing recently and, upon seeing him, thought he had gone crazy. But when Socrates had explained what he was doing, Charmides himself went home and practiced shadow-boxing for exercise (2.19). Philippos makes another ineffective joke (2.20). But the jester finally makes the group laugh by imitating the dancers (2.21). There is a call for wine, and Socrates approves, praising its gladdening effects. But he suggests that they should drink little and often, in the manner of plants (2.25) so that they may enjoy their drinks but not become intoxicated(2.26).

=== Chapter 3 ===
The boy plays the cithara and sings to the enjoyment of all. Charmides remarks that, like wine, music blended with the beauty of youth has a pleasing effect. Socrates points out that the performers give the onlookers pleasure and suggests that the symposiasts should make an effort to please each other as well. Everyone asks what he means (3.2). Socrates replies that he wants Kallias to fulfill his promise and demonstrate his wisdom (sophia). Kallias says he will do so if everyone else will share what good thing he understands. Socrates says that everyone should share whatever is the most valuable thing that he understands. Kallias then says that he prides himself most on being able to make men better. Antisthenes asks him whether he teaches men some craft, or gentlemanliness. Kallias says the latter, if it is justice. Antisthenes states that it certainly is, because gentlemanliness is never associated with injustice (3.4).

Kallias then says that whenever each man has said what beneficial thing he has, he himself will explain through what craft he makes men just. Nikeratos says he prides himself in his ability to recite the whole Iliad and Odyssey from memory. Antisthenes points out that even rhapsodes have that skill, and they are the most unintelligent of people, for they do not understand the hidden meanings (uponoia) of the poems. But Nikeratos had paid a large sum of money to learn from experts, and so he does understand these (3.6).

Kritoboulos prides himself most on his beauty. Socrates asks if he can improve men with his beauty, and Kritoboulos responds that he is not worth much if he cannot (3.7).

Antisthenes is proud of his wealth although we learn from Hermogenes' question that Antisthenes actually has little money or land, which fact he jokes about (3.8). His answer seems paradoxical. Charmides, on the other hand, prides himself on his poverty. Socrates praises this notion, because poverty does not cause envy, it is safe without being guarded, and it grows when neglected (3.9).

Next Kallias asks Socrates on what he prides himself. His answer, like his comments in sections2.16-2.19, is in jest (Huss reference). He says that he prides himself on match-making. Everyone laughs at his boast, and Socrates continues his jest saying that he could make a lot of money through the trade (3.10). This funny exchange leads Lykon to say that Philippos' pride must lie in jesting.

When asked by Antisthenes, Lykon says that he is most proud of his son, Autolykos. At this someone remarked that the boy was obviously proud of his victory in the pankration, but Autolykos denies this claiming instead to be most proud of his father (3.13). Kallias then addressed Lykon saying that he was the richest man in the world, a fact which Lykon admits. Finally Hermogenes says that he exalts most in the virtue and power of his friends because they can take care of him (3.14).

=== Chapter 4 ===
Socrates now pushes for each man to prove that the thing of which he is proud deserves being proud of. Kallias says that he makes men more just by giving them money (4.1). Antisthenes questions him on the matter, and Kallias says that men who have money for necessities are less inclined to crime. Kallias explains that no one repays him, not even with thanks. Antisthenes says it is remarkable that those whom Kallias benefits do not behave justly toward their benefactor. But Kallias counters Antisthenes with Socrates’ support, and the discussion ends (4.5).

Nikeratos is next to speak. He says that he can better any man by teaching him Homer, since the poet wrote about nearly all human activities. He claims that onions complement drinking well. Socrates points out that eating onions may lead to a reputation for overindulgence. It is also not beneficial for those who intend to kiss someone afterward (4.9).

Kritoboulos next explains why he is proud of his beauty. He says that his companions swear he is beautiful and so he believes it. If he is beautiful, then his companions must feel about him how he feels about Kleinias, a particularly beautiful man. While strong men must toil, brave men must adventure and wise men must speak eloquently, beautiful men attain their ends without doing anything (4.13). Kritoboulos addresses Kallias saying that he himself makes people more righteous than Kallias because he can encourage men toward every virtue. Handsome people make people more generous, more heroic in danger and more modest because they are ashamed of their desires (4.15). Likewise generals should be handsome men, he says, because their soldiers would follow them into battle more eagerly (4.16). And nor does beauty decay with age, he continues. People of every age have their own distinct beauty (4.17).

Kritoboulos then claims that the dancing boy or girl would sooner kiss him than Socrates (4.18). Socrates replies indignantly in jest and Kritoboulos compares Socrates to a satyr. Socrates challenges him to a beauty contest in which the performers will act as judges (4.20). Kritoboulos proposes Kleinias act as judge, at which Socrates accuses him of always thinking of him. It is revealed that Kritoboulos' father had sent his son to Socrates to see what he could do about that fact (4.24). But Kritoboulos had kissed Kleinias and a kiss is the greatest incitement toward passion (4.25). Socrates therefore advises that those seeking to be prudent and moderate not kiss those in the bloom of their beauty. But Charmides jokingly calls Socrates a hypocrite, and that he had seen Socrates himself lusting after Kritoboulos. Socrates replies in feigned indignity and playfully warns Kritoboulos not to touch him until the young man grew a beard (4.28).

Charmides is asked why he values his poverty. He explains that, while he had been rich, he was always fearful of losing his property, the city always asked him for money, he had no chance for travel and he was always suffering. Now that he was poor, he says, he has the privilege of doing as he pleases, and he lives at the expense of the city. When he had money he was ridiculed for associating with Socrates and now he is free to do so. Whereas before he was afraid of losing property, now he expects to gain something (4.32). Kallias asks if he wishes to remain poor, and he replies that he does not.

Antisthenes is now asked to explain the paradox (3.9) that he is not wealthy, yet he prides himself on his wealth. He replies that wealth lies not in property, but in one's soul (psuche) (4.34). He explains that men who have much wealth fear themselves so poor that they jump at every opportunity to increase it. There are also wealthy people who commit crimes more terrible than those that poor people commit, he says (4.36). He pities such men as they are never satisfied, although they consume in abundance. Antisthenes has enough to satisfy his basic needs and is perfectly content with his lot(4.37-4.39). His greatest bit of wealth is that, even if his property was taken from him, he could earn enough at any job to meet his means (4.40). Indeed, those who are content with what they have are more honest than those who desire to make more money because they do not covet others' property (4.42). Antisthenes attributes his wealth and generosity to Socrates’ teachings. His most exquisite possession of all is leisure which allows him to see what is worth seeing, hear what is worth hearing, and to spend all day with Socrates (4.44).

Kallias remarks that Antisthenes' wealth is praiseworthy because no one resents him for not giving them a loan. Nikeratos cuts in and makes a joke about his own fondness of money which makes everyone laugh (4.45).

It now falls to Hermogenes to explain why he was proud (3.14) about his friends and their favor of him. He reveals that the friends to which he was referring are the gods themselves. Socrates inquires how Hermogenes keeps the gods so friendly toward him. He replies that he prays to them, returns some of what they give him, avoids profanity and lying.

Next they question Philippos about his pride in jesting. He answers that when someone has good fortune, they desire that Philippos be in their company, and when they suffer bad luck, they run away from him for fear that he would make them laugh in spite of themselves 4.50). Nikeratos says the jester's pride is justified because the opposite happens to him.

Finally Kallias asks Socrates to explain his pride in match-making. Socrates insists that they first agree on the functions of the match-maker. They conclude that the match-maker's job is to make people attractive to the community (4.60). Socrates then says that Antisthenes is a good match-maker because he introduced Kallias (4.62) and Socrates to several people (4.63). Such a person could also arrange suitable marriages and friendship between cities, he argues.

=== Chapter 5 ===
Instead of challenging Socrates to a contest on wisdom, since they were the only two who were proud of an art and were able to prove that they should be proud of it, Kallias goads Kritoboulos into the beauty contest with Socrates (5.1). Kritoboulos accepts, but says that a light must be shined on Socrates. Socrates proceeds to question Kritoboulos by using the Socratic Method, and Kritoboulos is finally forced to accept that he has lost the debate. He calls for votes to be counted (5.8). Socrates insists that the light be shined on Kritoboulos so that the judges not be deceived (5.9). The ballots are counted and Kritoboulos is selected unanimously as the victor. Kritoboulos’ money corrupted the voters, unlike Kallias’ which makes men more honest, Socrates jives (5.9).

=== Chapter 6 ===
While some urge Kritoboulos to claim the kisses he has won in the beauty contest, Socrates addresses Hermogenes. He says that the latter's taciturnity is annoying to the other guests. Hermogenes counters him, saying that he can hardly get a word in because the others talk so much (6.2). He asks if Socrates would prefer him to speak during the performances when everyone is silent (6.3). Socrates agrees, saying that Hermogenes’ speech would be enhanced by the accompaniment (6.4).

The Syracusan notices this conversation and, upset that they are ignoring his performances, asks Socrates if he is the one called the “Thinker” and accuses him of pondering celestial objects (a reference to the charge of his supposed impiety, for which he is sentenced to death in 399 B.C. with Lykon as one of his accusers) (6.6). Socrates counters him, saying that the gods are celestial and beneficial. In turn, the Syracusan asks Socrates to tell him the distance between the two of them in flea's feet (a reference to Socrates’ caricature in Aristophanes’ Clouds which was performed two years before the dramatic date of the Symposium.

Antisthenes calls Philippos to defend Socrates by imitating the Syracusan, seeming to scold Socrates (6.8). Socrates forbids him from doing so, lest he also seem to abuse the Syracusan (6.9). Philippos asks how, if he is not allowed to imitate anyone, he can render his services at a symposium. Socrates responds that he should avoid topics which should not be spoken of at such a gathering (this alerts the reader that there are topics which should be avoided at such a pleasant dinner, much like some conversation is not appropriate to the dinner table today) (6.10).

=== Chapter 7 ===
Socrates proposes that they all sing a song, and they do. A potter's wheel was brought in atop which the dancing girl was to perform juggling. Socrates remarks to the Syracusan that he himself may indeed be a “Thinker.” As a result, he says, he is considering how the performers may most please the banqueters. For all these spectacular performances are surely remarkable, but so is the fact that a lamp gives light while bronze does not, though both are bright; that oil feeds flame while water extinguishes it, though both are liquids (7.4). Though these questions are interesting, they are not appropriate to a symposium. Socrates proposes that a less marvelous performance, a dance accompanied by the flute, would be more appropriate and pleasing. The Syracusan agrees (7.5).

=== Chapter 8 ===
When the Syracusan leaves to prepare the next performance, Socrates begins a speech on Eros. He says that all of them – Socrates, Charmides, Kritoboulos, Nikeratos and Hermogenes – have felt the power of love. Socrates asks Antisthenes if he is the only one present not in love with someone (8.3). Antisthenes insists that he is not, for he is in love with Socrates! (Antisthenes was one of the main Socratic authors, contemporary with Plato and Xenophon, who also presumably loved Socrates.) Socrates dismisses him, insisting that he is busy (8.4). Antisthenes continues, accusing Socrates of always having an excuse to ignore him (8.5). Socrates pleads that Antisthenes stop berating him, and jokingly suggests that Antisthenes keep his love a secret since it is clearly a love of Socrates’ physical beauty, not his sprit (8.6).

Socrates returns to his speech and addresses Kallias. The whole city knows, he says, that Kallias is in love with Autolykos (8.7). Socrates says that he has always admired Kallias’ character, but even more so at present because he sees that he is in love with a young man who epitomizes strength, manliness, and moderation. The character of the object of one's affections reflects on the lover's character (8.8). Socrates suggests the possibility of the existence of two aspects of Aphrodite; one the goddess of Vulgar (sexual) love, the other of Heavenly (chaste) love (8.9). Further, carnal love might stem from the Vulgar Aphrodite, and spiritual love from the Heavenly. The latter is the sort of love that Kallias seems to have for Autolykos (8.10). Socrates says this because Kallias makes his love known to the boy's father, Lykon (8.11).

Hermogenes praises Socrates for, by praising the ideal, encouraging Kallias to conform to it. Socrates will show that spiritual love is superior to carnal love (8.12). Spiritual lovers enjoy each other, while physical lovers may hate the habits of their lover (8.13). Or if the physical lovers also enjoy each other's habits, the youth's beauty disappears with age along with the affection felt for them, while spiritual love only grows with age (8.14). Physical lust can be sated like hunger is sated by food, but spiritual love is more pure and cannot be easily sated, though it is not less rich (8.15). The noble soul naturally shows affection for the object of its love, but this affection is also returned (8.16). For what person, knowing themselves loved unconditionally, could not return that affection (8.17)? Those that love another spiritually derive many benefits from the relationship which continue down to old age (8.18). But what benefit does the one valued only for his beauty derive (8.19)? If his lover uses persuasion he corrupts the soul of the one loved for his beauty (8.20). The one loved for his beauty is not touched by the same affection as the one who loves him for a youth does not take pleasure in intercourse as a woman does, but soberly looks on as the other is intoxicated by lust (8.21). He may thus develop ill feelings toward his lover, but this does not happen in spiritual love (8.22). In spiritual love the elder often acts as a fatherly figure, an educator, while in physical love the elder is always seeking another kiss, another caress (8.23). One who rents a farm is like one desirous of physical love; he simply seeks whatever harvest it will yield to himself. One who buys a farm, however, is like the man who enjoys spiritual love, for he uses all his resources to enrich the relationship (8.25). The beautiful youth is secure in his relationship and will act loosely, while one who is loved spiritually will be moderate to retain their lover's faith (8.26). Such a person will engender goodness in their companion as a result (8.27). Socrates maintains that not only people, but also gods value spiritual love more highly than the carnal (8.28).

Socrates concludes that all would probably trust one who finds loveliness in the spirit over one who tended toward carnal love (8.36). He praises Kallias’ affections for Autolykos because the boy is vigorous in his pursuit of victory and fame for his city (8.38). To favorably impress Autolykos, Socrates says, Kallias must consider how Themistokles liberated Greece, how Perikles was a great counselor to the city, how Solon created valuable laws and how the Lacedaemonians came to become great military leaders (8.39). The city would then entrust him with great responsibility, since he appears most able to bear hardship (8.40). Socrates apologizes if he has spoken more seriously than the circumstances provided for, but says that he has always loved men who long for virtue in addition to their already-good nature (8.41). Autolykos and Kallias share a gaze while the latter addresses Socrates. He asks if Socrates intends to play match-maker and get Kallias to enter politics (8.42). Socrates responds in the affirmative, as long as Kallias really values virtue (8.43).

=== Chapter 9 ===
Autolykos rises to go for a walk and Lykon, following closely behind him, praises Socrates’ noble character. This comment is likely meant to have been ironic by Xenophon, since Lykon was one of Socrates’ accusers at his trial in 399 B.C. (9.1).

The Syracusan enters and announces the last performance. One of the girls plays Ariadne, a fair, modest girl. The boy plays Dionysus who enters the room to the tune of the flute. The two embrace in a clearly loving embrace. They profess their love for each other and head for the bridal couch. Those looking on who were not married vowed to marry and those who were married returned to their wives.

== Themes ==
=== Eros (Love) ===
Eros plays a large part in the Symposium. Kallias is possessed by a desire for the beautiful Autolykos, Charmides becomes infatuated with the Syracusan's performers, Kritoboulos lusts after Kleinias, and Socrates gives a lengthy speech on love in chapter eight. The final performance by the Syracusan and his troupe exhibit an ideal display of Eros in chapter nine. Xenophon calls to our attention the different ways in which humans are affected by and react to the power of love.

=== Wisdom ===
The topic of wisdom arises when Socrates reminds Kallias of his promise to demonstrate the wisdom he has attained through his studies with the sophists (3.2). Kallias agrees to do this, provided that each of his guests share whatever good thing he understands. Socrates agrees, but prefers that the guests should tell everyone upon what thing they place the most pride or value. They all do so, and then Socrates asks that they defend why the thing they named is worth being proud of (4.1). Only Kallias and Socrates are able to do so. The stage is set for a discussion of wisdom between these two, but it never happens, presumably because such a discussion is too serious for a symposium.

=== Virtue ===
The teachability of virtue is questioned in chapter two (2.6), but then the Socrates suggests that they talk about something else (2.7). The issue soon reemerges (2.19) when Socrates suggests that women's nature is not inferior to men's except in strength and judgment, and so each man should teach his wife what he wishes (2.9). After an impressive performance by one of the girls, Socrates remarks that manliness can be taught even to women (2.19). The issue is brought to conclusion in chapter four when Kallias proves that he can make men more virtuous by giving them money (4.5). This conclusion is restated in Socrates’ speech about Eros in chapter eight. He says that a virtuous lover wishing to make a good friend of their companion must first behave virtuously himself. Thus associating with a virtuous person has the effect of making one more virtuous (8.27).

== Interpretation ==
=== Misunderstanding ===
As part of the Socratic Corpus, the symposium was, until fairly recently, regarded as an entirely serious dialogue. Scholars thought that it was written sincerely and they largely interpreted the text literally. Bernard Huss completely changed scholars' understanding and interpretation of the work. He effectively proved that much of the dialogue is intended to be comical, satirical, and ironic. Xenophon cleverly manipulates playfulness (paidia) and seriousness (spoude) in a manner appropriate to the mood of a symposium and conducive to lighthearted discussion.

Ancient authors did not comment upon the work's comedic nature, but treated it seriously as a Socratic dialogue. Modern scholars were thus predisposed to such an interpretation. Before Huss, most scholars awkwardly explained and translated certain sections of the text, but now it is understood that in such sections (for example, 2.15-2.19, 3.10, 4.18, 4.25-4.28, 4.45, 4.60-4.61, 5.1-5.2) a joke is intended.

=== The Symposium as apologetic literature ===
Bernhard Huss presented the theory that the Symposium acts as an apology, a defense, of Socrates. In the dialogue Xenophon portrays Socrates not as a corrupter of the youth or as being an impious man (the charges levied against him in 399 B.C.) but as a moral man. Kritoboulos’ father had handed him over to Socrates to protect him (4.24). Socrates does not corrupt the youth but exhorts Kallias away from the corruptive forces of physical love in his speech in chapter eight. And Socrates defends himself against the Syracusan's charge of thinking not of the gods, but of celestial objects (6.6). In this way, Xenophon implicitly argues for Socrates’ innocence.

=== The "Forgiving Xenophon" ===
In section in 8.27, Socrates concludes that associating with virtuous people can foster virtue within oneself. Bernhard Huss uses this conclusion as an explanation for the “forgiving Xenophon.” He claims that because, after the death of Socrates, some of the symposiasts no longer had a teacher of virtue, they became unvirtuous because of their lack of exposure to it. Huss thinks that Xenophon is attempting to account for the abhorrent behavior of Charmides and the other members of the Thirty.

== Relationship to Xenophon's Other Works ==
The Symposium is a Socratic dialogue, one of Xenophon's smaller works. For a complete list of his works, see Xenophon.

== Relationship to Plato's Symposium ==
There has been some dispute about whether Xenophon's or Plato's work was written first. Henry Graham Dakyns, a Victorian-era scholar who translated many works by both Plato and Xenophon, believed that Plato knew of this work, and that it influenced him to some degree when he wrote his own Symposium.

However, most later scholars have taken one particular argument, the argument against an army of lovers in Socrates' final speech, as proof that Xenophon had based his work on Plato's, since this concept is mentioned in Plato's work. The speech seems to parody or pastiche the erotic speeches in both Plato's Symposium and Phaedrus.

Though some scholars have argued that the long speech of Socrates contains later additions, and opinion is divided as to which author was first to write a Socratic symposium, recent scholarship generally holds that Xenophon wrote the Symposium in the second half of the 360s, benefiting from Plato's former Socratic literature.

While Plato's Symposium consists of a series of lengthy speeches in praise of love, Xenophon's is dominated by witty repartee.

== References and sources ==
Sources

- Gray, V. J. “Xenophon's Symposion: The Display of Wisdom,” Hermes 120.1 (1992), 58–75.
- Huss, Bernhard. “The Dancing Sokrates and the Laughing Xenophon, or the Other 'Symposium,” The American Journal of Philology, 120.3 (Autumn, 1999), 381–409.
- Strauss, Leo; Xenophon's Socrates, Ithaca, Cornell University Press, 1972.
- Pangle, Thomas L. “Socratic Political Philosophy in Xenophon's 'Symposium,” American Journal of Political Science 54.1 (Jan., 2010), 140–152.
- Wellman, Robert R. “Socratic Method in Xenophon,” Journal of History Ideas 37.2 (Apr.-Jun., 1976), 307–318.
- Xenophon. Symposium. Ed. A.J. Bowen. Warminster: Aris & Phillips Ltd, 1998.
- Xenophon; The Shorter Socratic Writings: "Apology of Socrates to the Jury," "Oeconomicus," and "Symposium," trans. and with interpretive essays by Robert C. Bartlett, with Thomas Pangle and Wayne Ambler, Ithaca: Cornell University Press, The Agora Editions, 1996.
