= Lord Bridges (disambiguation) =

Lord Bridges may refer to Mark Bridges, 3rd Baron Bridges, the incumbent holder of the peerage title Baron Bridges.

It may also refer to:

- Edward Bridges, 1st Baron Bridges, former UK Cabinet Secretary
- Thomas Bridges, 2nd Baron Bridges, former UK Ambassador to Italy
- George Bridges, Baron Bridges of Headley, former UK government minister for Brexit
