= Thomas Farrer =

Thomas Farrer may refer to:

- Thomas Farrer, 1st Baron Farrer (1819–1899), English civil servant and statistician
- Thomas Charles Farrer (1838–1891), English-born painter and teacher of painting
- Thomas Farrer, 2nd Baron Farrer (1859–1940)
- Thomas Farrer (MP), member of parliament for Wareham
