= Baron Bridges =

Barony in the Peerage of the United Kingdom

Baron Bridges, of Headley in the County of Surrey and of Saint Nicholas at Wade in the County of Kent, is a title in the Peerage of the United Kingdom. It was created on 4 February 1957 for the prominent civil servant Sir Edward Bridges. He was Cabinet Secretary from 1938 to 1946. He was succeeded by his son, the second Baron, in 1969. He notably served as British Ambassador to Italy from 1983 to 1987. Lord Bridges was one of the ninety-two elected hereditary peers that remained in the House of Lords after the passing of the House of Lords Act 1999, before his removal for non-attendance in 2016. As of 2017 the title is held by his son, the third Baron, who succeeded to the title in that year. He was the solicitor to, among others, Queen Elizabeth II and other members of the royal family.

The first Baron was the son of poet laureate Robert Bridges. The first Baron's grandson and current Baron's cousin was created a life peer as Baron Bridges of Headley.

The family seat is Great House, near Orford, Suffolk.

== Barons Bridges (1957) ==
- Edward Ettingdene Bridges, 1st Baron Bridges (1892–1969)
- Thomas Edward Bridges, 2nd Baron Bridges (1927–2017)
- Mark Thomas Bridges, 3rd Baron Bridges (born 1954)
  - Hon. Miles Edmund Farrer Bridges (1992–2018)

The heir presumptive is the present holder's younger brother, the Hon. Nicholas Edward Bridges (born 1956).
The heir presumptive's heir apparent is his son, Matthew Orlando Bridges (born 1988).

=== Line of succession ===
- Edward Ettingdean Bridges, 1st Baron Bridges (1892–1969)
  - Thomas Edward Bridges, 2nd Baron Bridges (1927–2017)
    - Mark Thomas Bridges, 3rd Baron Bridges (born 1954)
    - (1) Hon. Nicholas Edward Bridges (born 1956)
      - (2) Matthew Orlando Bridges (born 1988)
  - Hon. Robert Oliver Bridges (1930–2015)
    - (3) (John) Edward Bridges (born 1968)
    - (4) (James) George Robert Bridges, Baron Bridges of Headley (born 1970)
      - (5) Hon. Alfred Edward George Bridges (born 2008)
