= George Bridges, Baron Bridges of Headley =

British politician (born 1970)

The Right Honourable The Lord Bridges of Headley MBE
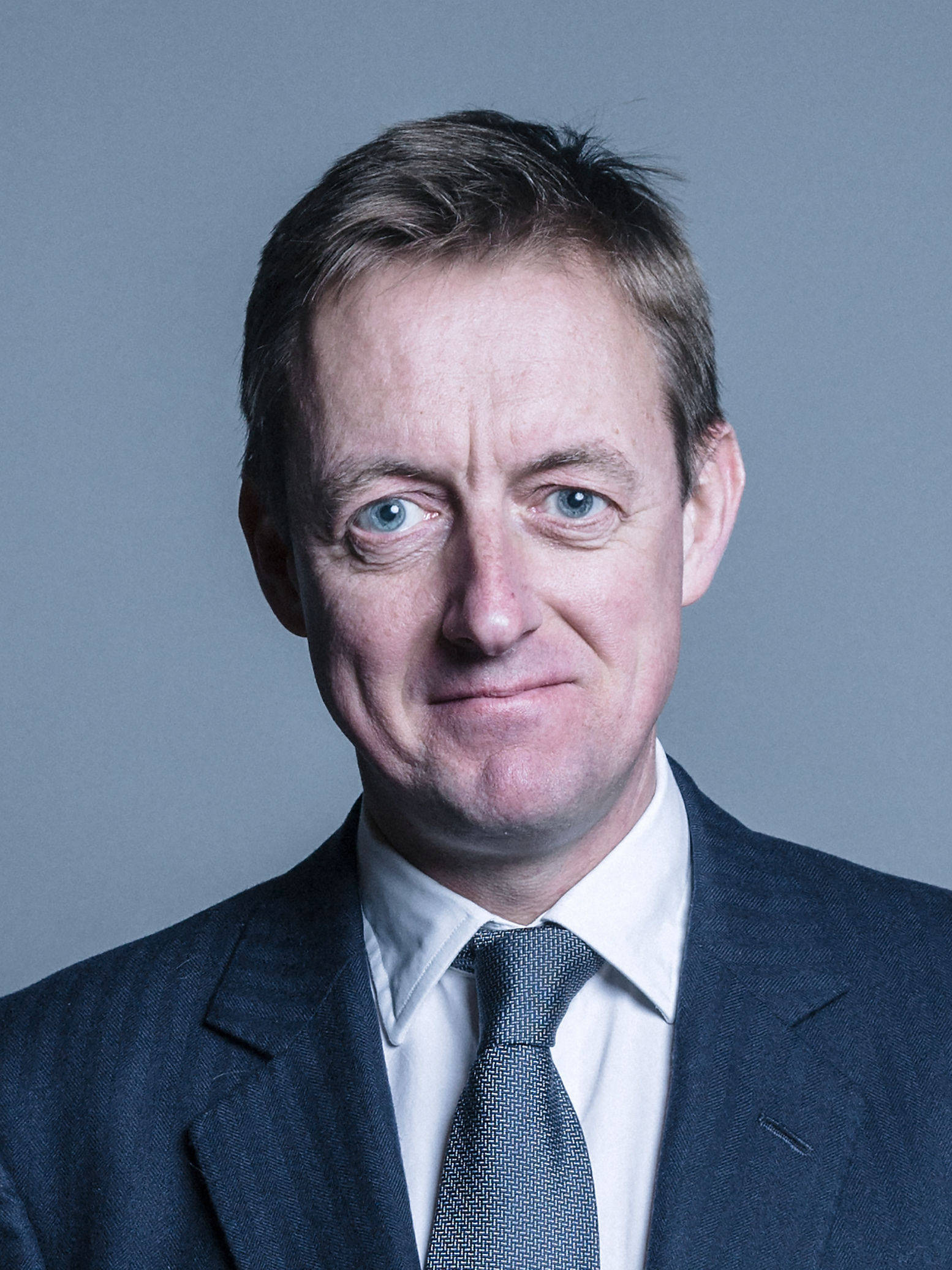

Chair of the Economic Affairs Committee
- Incumbent
- Assumed office 19 January 2022
- Preceded by: The Lord Forsyth of Drumlean

Parliamentary Under-Secretary of State for Exiting the European Union
- In office 13 July 2016 – 12 June 2017
- Prime Minister: Theresa May
- Preceded by: Position established
- Succeeded by: Steve Baker

Parliamentary Secretary for the Cabinet Office
- In office 29 May 2015 – 12 July 2016
- Prime Minister: David Cameron
- Preceded by: Sam Gyimah
- Succeeded by: Chris Skidmore

Member of the House of Lords
- Lord Temporal
- Life peerage 28 May 2015

Personal details
- Party: Conservative
- Education: Exeter College, Oxford

James George Robert Bridges, Baron Bridges of Headley is a British politician. He served as Parliamentary Under-Secretary of State at the Department for Exiting the European Union.

== Education ==
Bridges was educated at Rokeby Preparatory School, then attended Eton College followed by Exeter College, Oxford, where he received a BA degree (later promoted to an MA by seniority).

== Life and career ==
Bridges was Assistant Political Secretary to the Prime Minister John Major from 1994 to 1997. He was appointed a Member of the Order of the British Empire (MBE) in 1997. In the 2000s he served as Director of the Conservative Research Department, succeeded by James O'Shaughnessy, Baron O'Shaughnessy, and Campaign Director of the Conservative Party.

He was created a life peer as Baron Bridges of Headley, of Headley Heath in the County of Surrey, on 28 May 2015.

Bridges served as a parliamentary secretary at the Department for Exiting the European Union in 2016 and 2017.

Bridges serves as Chair of the House of Lords Economic Affairs Committee.

== Family connections ==
The Lord Bridges of Headley is a great-grandson of Poet Laureate Robert Bridges, and a grandson of senior civil servant Edward Bridges, 1st Baron Bridges. He is a nephew of the late crossbench peer and ambassador to Italy Thomas Bridges, 2nd Baron Bridges, and of historian Margaret Aston.

Orders of precedence in the United Kingdom
Preceded by The Lord O'Neill of Gatley	Life peer The Lord Bridges of Headley	Followed by The Lord Prior of Brampton
