= Alan Campbell (diplomat) =

British diplomat and civil servant (1919–2007)

- Born: Alan Hugh Campbell; July 1, 1919
- Died: October 7, 2007 (aged 88); London, England
- Occupations: Diplomat, civil servant

Alan Hugh Campbell GCMG (1 July 1919 – 7 October 2007) was a British diplomat and civil servant. He was British ambassador to Ethiopia from 1969 to 1972, and to Italy from 1976 to 1979, and also held senior posts in the Foreign Office in London.

== Early life and education ==
Campbell was born on 1 July 1919. His father had retired from the family business, Ibert & Co, and bought a large house, Combe Royal, near Kingsbridge on the south coast of Devon. Alan Campbell was educated at Sherborne School from 1932 to 1937. He was fluent in French and German, and read modern languages at Gonville and Caius College, Cambridge. He obtained a First in his Part I examinations, but the Second World War intervened before Part II. He briefly served in the Suffolk Regiment before being commissioned in the Devonshire Regiment. He later served as a staff officer in SOE.

== Diplomatic career ==
Campbell joined the Foreign Office in 1946. He became Private Secretary to the Permanent Under-Secretary, Sir William Strong (later Baron Strong) in 1950. During his period as Private Secretary, the civil service was rocked by the defections of diplomats Guy Burgess and Donald Maclean.

Campbell served as first secretary in Rome and then in Peking from 1952 to 1957, and spent a year at the Imperial Defence College in 1958. He became Assistant Head of the news department in 1959, and then joined the British Mission to the United Nations in 1961, as Counsellor and Head of Chancery to Sir Patrick Dean and then Lord Caradon. During his period in New York City, he was closely involved in the Cuban Missile Crisis. He was appointed CMG in 1964.

Campbell was Head of the Western Department at the Foreign Office from 1965 to 1967, dealing with Britain's relationships with its allies in western Europe, and then Counsellor in Paris from 1967 to 1969, where he was Counsellor and Head of Chancery to Sir Patrick Reilly and Christopher Soames.

Campbell was then ambassador to Ethiopia from 1969 to 1972, at the court of Emperor Haile Selassie in Addis Ababa. As he was driven to present his credentials to the Emperor, he noticed people bowing, saluting and kneeling as he passed by, because his car was flying the flag of the Emperor in addition to the ambassador's flag. He reported that Haile Selassie was dignified and regal and "with an air of grave benevolence".

Campbell returned to London as Assistant Under-Secretary of State at the Foreign and Commonwealth Office from 1972 to 1974, supervising the departments dealing with southern Africa, and then a Deputy Under-Secretary of State from 1974 to 1976, as political director. He was British ambassador to Italy from 1976 to 1979, while the Red Brigades were active – former Prime Minister of Italy Aldo Moro was abducted and murdered in 1978. He was advanced to KCMG in 1976 and GCMG in 1979.

== Later career ==
Campbell later worked as a foreign affairs advisor to Rolls-Royce, and was a director of National Westminster Bank and Mercantile and General Reinsurance. He was Chairman of the British-Italian Society from 1983 to 1990, and Chairman of the British School at Rome from 1987 to 1994. He was a member of the council of the London Philharmonic Orchestra for eight years. He was also a Governor of Sherborne School from 1973 to 1987. He published his memoirs, Colleagues and Friends, in 1988.

== Additional personal information ==
Campbell was a member of the Beefsteak Club and Brooks's, and enjoyed playing tennis. He retired to the West Country, where he enjoyed painting watercolours.

In 1947, Campbell married Margaret Jean Taylor. She died in 1999, from illness. In later life, he lived in a flat in Westminster. He died on 7 October 2007, aged 88, in London.

Diplomatic posts
Preceded by Sir Guy Millard	British Ambassador to Italy; 1976–1979	Succeeded by Sir Ronald Arculus
