= Eromenos =

Younger partner in the ancient Greek institution of pederastic mentorship

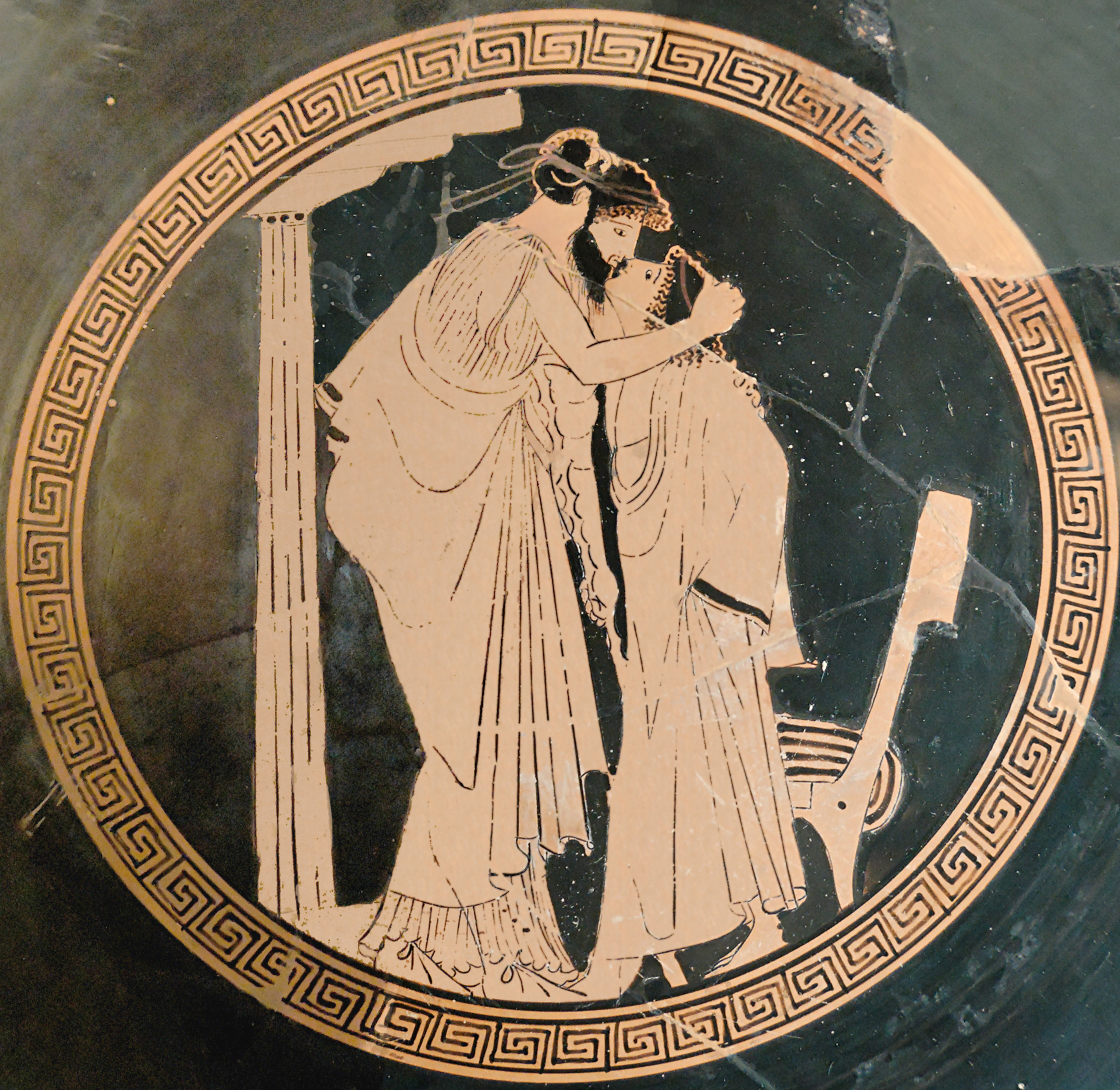
Erastes (lover) and eromenos (beloved) kissing. Tondo of an Attic red-figured cup, ca. 480 BCE. Louvre Museum

In ancient Greece, an eromenos was the younger partner in a formalized relationship of mentorship and love between an older man (the erastes) and an adolescent male.

== Terminology ==
Erômenos (ἐρώμενος) means 'one who is sexually desired' in Greek language and is the past participle of the verb eramai, to have sexual desire. In Greek Homosexuality, the first modern scholarly work on this topic, Kenneth Dover used the literal translation of the Greek word as an English word to refer to the passive partner in Greek homosexual relationship. Though in many contexts the younger man is also called pais, 'boy', the word can also be used for child, girl, son, daughter and slave, and therefore eromenos would be more specific and can "avoid the cumbrousness and…imprecision of 'boy'". It is in contrast to the masculine active participle erάn ('be in love with...', 'have a passionate desire for'). The word erastes (lover), however, can be adapted to a married man's role in both heterosexual and homosexual relationship.

== Characteristics ==
In vase paintings and other artworks, the eromenos is often depicted as a beautiful young adult. His relatively small stature suggests his passive role in the relationship and younger age as well as social status. Usually, they show a combination of a youthful-looking face with a body which possesses mature musculature. The lack of beard and pubic hair are an important clue in identifying an eromenos, though this may possibly be attributed to style. A poem quoted in Greek Sexuality (couplet 1327f) shows that ‘the poet will never cease to ‘fawn on’ the boy so long as the boy's cheek is hairless.

Therefore, it may be concluded that eromenos is not a fixed term, as it is only a stage in the development of young Greek men. After they grow up, their relationship with the erastes could end and they could get married or start another relationship. This experience, similar to some forms of socially-constructed bisexuality, is also shown in books, such as how Bion the Borysthenite condemns Alcibiades, that in his adolescence he drew away the husbands from their wives, and as a young man the wives from their husbands. According to Garrison, for Cretan boys, the passage to adulthood is the ‘prewedding’ of sex with a mature man.

== Representation ==
=== Visual art ===
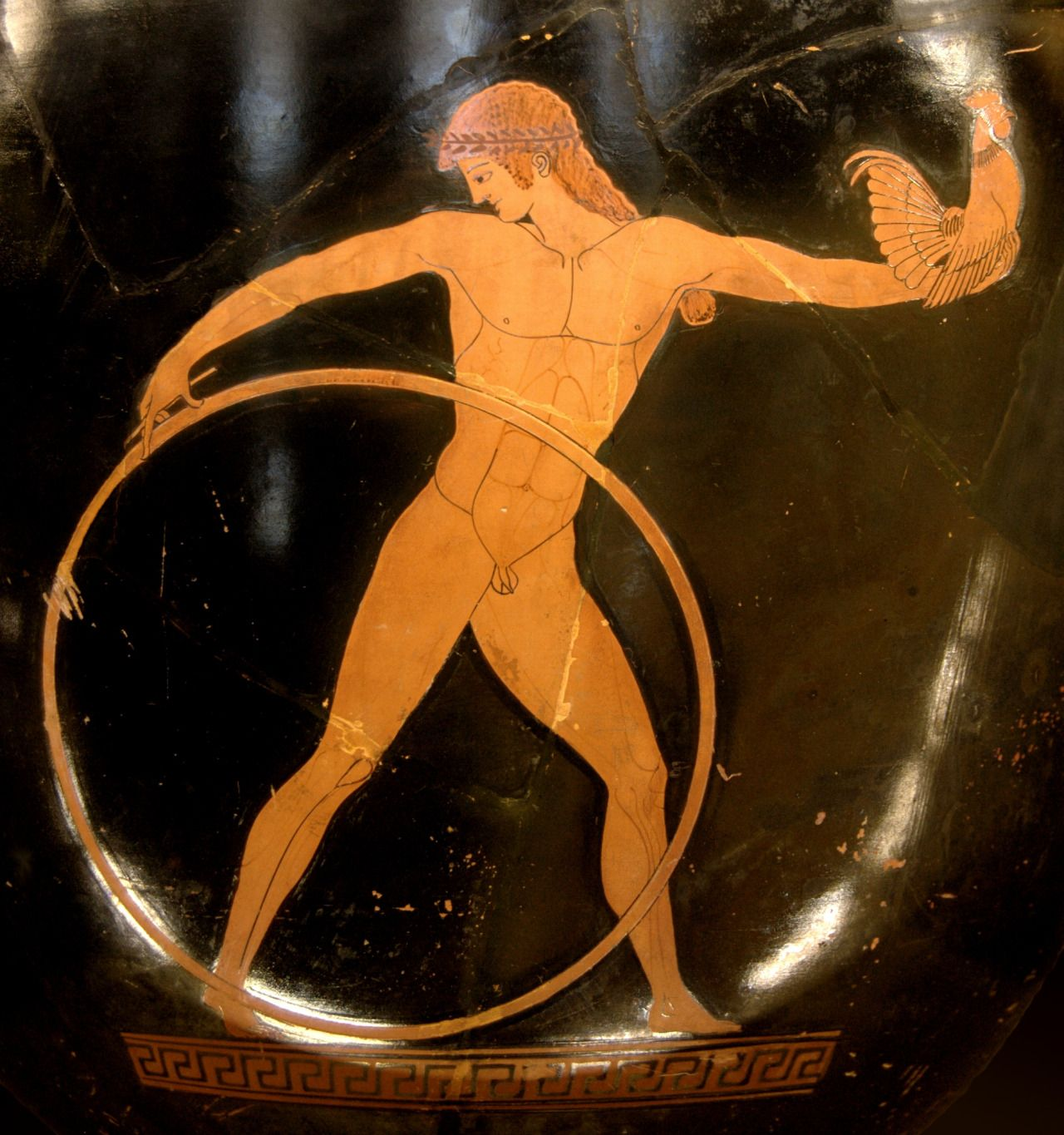
Ganymede rolling a hoop and bearing aloft a cockerel, a love-gift from Zeus, early fifth century B.C., Musée du Louvre.

The image of Ganymede in the figure on the right is an idealized portrait of an eromenos. The muscles on his body contrast with the hoop, a child's toy which emphasises the shape of his genitals and inner thighs, and he holds the cockerel, which is the love gift from Zeus. There is no moustache or pubic hair.

John Beazley's three types of erotic scenes appear in Athenian vase paintings. Eromenoi are often touched on chin and genitals by their erastes (alpha group), presented with gifts (beta group) or entwined between the thighs of their erastes (gamma group). Meanwhile, Eva Cantarella discovered that representations of pederastic relationships contain two successive moments of courtship. The first phase is similar to Beazley's alpha group, while in the second phase the eromenos stands behind the erastes with his penis between his thighs, somehow similar to the gamma group. This vase (Brygos Painter) depicts a classical scene of an erastes courting an eromenos. As the eromenos’ legs are positioned between the erastes’ thighs with the erastes touching his penis and his chin, it is similar to the alpha group. The pectoral and belly muscles show that he was well-trained in wrestling schools, and the bag of ‘Kydonian apples’ or quinces is a sign of his sexual awakening.

Dover and Gundel Koch-Harnack have argued that the gift-giving scene to the eromenos is in fact a courting scene. Common gifts include a sprig of flowers, a rabbit, and a fighting cock.

=== Poems and literature ===
The love for an eromenos is a frequent topic in Ancient Greek poems. Dover studied poems related to pederasty and quoted some verses expressing love to the eromonos, 'O boy with the virginal eyes, I seek you, but you do not listen, not knowing that you are the charioteer of my soul!' Also, a surviving fragment of Solon from the early sixth century B.C. writes that ‘Till he loves a lad in the flower of youth, bewitched by thighs and by sweet lips.’

The graffiti of Thera verified that anal penetration was normal in pederastic relationships, for in the inscriptions, Krimon used the verb oiphein (male sexual act performed as either active or passive partner in Dorian dialect) to describe the intercourse with his eromenos, which indicates anal penetration. Also, literature suggested that the charm of the eromenos lay in his attractive anal area, which was described by various metaphors such as rosebud, fruits, figs or gold.

It is noteworthy that most of the Greek verses about homosexuality were about how the erastes longed for the eromenos, but few were written from the perspective of the eromenos.

=== Myths ===
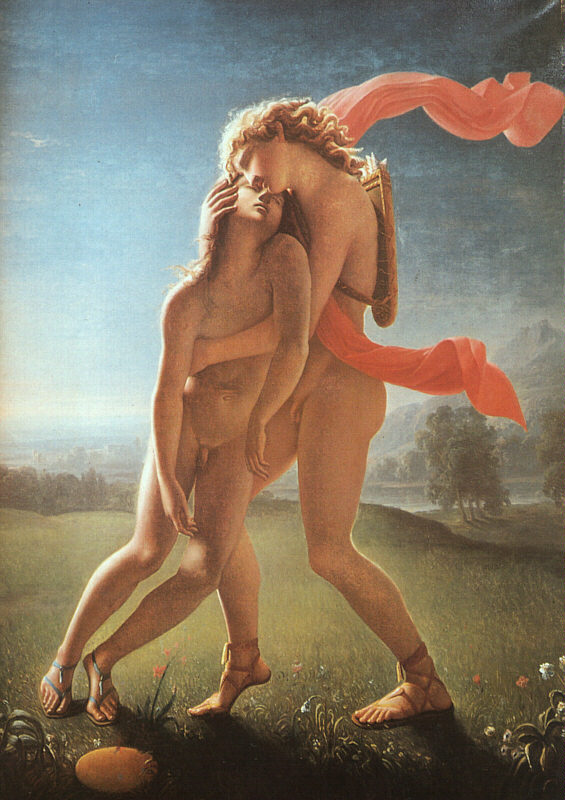
The Death of Hyacinthos (1801) by Jean Broc. Hyacinth (left) has been killed by the discus at his feet thrown by Apollo (right).

The erastes-eromenos relationship can be not only between humans but also between humans and gods. The love between Apollo and Hyacinth was said to have been the archetype of pederasty in Sparta. Apollo fell in love with Hyacinth on account of his youthful beauty, and became his instructor in archery, music, hunting and the gymnasium. Hyacinth was killed by the discus thrown by Apollo when studying discus-throwing with him, and in some versions of myths it was Zephyr (the god of the west wind) who also loved Hyacinth, and who disturbed the wind to cause this accident.

Though usually known as the mortal lover of Aphrodite, Adonis was said to be loved by other gods such as Apollo, Heracles and Dionysus, for his youth and beauty.

== Attitudes ==
The Athenians banned slaves from pursuing courtship of freeborn youths with themselves as the active partner, as Against Timarchus states that 'A slave shall not be the lover of a free boy nor follow after him, or else he shall receive fifty blows of the public lash'; but this did not apply to free men. Nevertheless, to be in such a relationship with honour, eromenoi were supposed to resist the pursuit of their erastes to test their love, before finally yielding. According to Foucault, an eromenos should avoid being chased too easily, receiving too many gifts or quickly getting into a relationship before the erastes proved their passion, love and responsibility. Moreover, the perception of pederasty varied in different cities. While it was allowed in Elis and Boeotia, Ionians did not accept pederastic courtship. Athenians held a complicated attitude, as it was considered that Athenian fathers ought to protect their sons from suitors.

== Scholarship ==
=== Analysis of power structure ===
According to several scholars, what the eromenoi gained from their erastes were not material rewards, but intellectual and moral edification, as well as learning how to achieve ejaculation, as pederasty was regarded as a process of education and sensual pleasure. However, Michel Foucault argued that, according to Plutarch, the erastes' sexual contact was imposed through violence, and the eromenos would feel anger, hatred, the desire for revenge and social shame through having become an object of contempt, which Foucault called acharistos.

=== Comparison with women ===
In heterosexual erotic images in Ancient Greece, the gender roles of male and female are often depicted as the dominant and subordinate positions. Women are depicted bending over, recumbent, or supported by men positioned upright or on top; while eromenoi are often depicted as experiencing ‘intercrural sex’ (i.e., between the thighs), with their partners standing face-to-face with them.

To erastes, whether the appeal and seduction of the eromenos lies in their masculinity or femininity is contested. Dover discovered a line of Athenian Kritias quoted by a Roman writer, 'In males, the most beautiful appearance is that which is female; but in females, the opposite.' However, due to the lack of specific context and further supporting evidence, we cannot conclude that female characteristics of eromenos are the stimuli of pederasty. He also found that beardless male and female faces share the same contours, except for the eyes. Some scholars like Eva Cantarella and Cohen found that the lengths of time during which one ought to resist one's suitors' advances were similar in both same-sex and different-sex courtships; since the honour lay not in the refusal, but the choice of which was the best time to give in. Also, Garrison argues that the love of boys by men is emblematic of attitudes prevalent among the ruling class, in which love for women is devalued. The love for eromenoi can be related to misogyny in Ancient Greece.

Not all homosexual relationships in Ancient Greece are typified as pederasty or as the erastes-eromenos relationship. The love between Achilles and Patroclus might be a counterargument to pederasty, for both of them showed their masculinity in this heroic, blood-brother like relationship, and were around the same age, with Patroclus only slightly older than Achilles.

== Later depictions ==
The 20th-century English and South African writer Mary Renault was famous for her romantic novels on pederasty in Ancient Greece. Her novel The Last of the Wine (1956) tells the love story of Alexias, a beautiful and noble Athenian youth and Socrates’ student who was chased by a number of older men because of his beauty. Bernard F. Dick commented on her novels that they provided historically accurate representation of Greek homosexuality. Her fan community also created artworks that imitate Greek vase paintings portraying courting scenes between the erastes and eromenos.

== See also ==
- Pederasty in ancient Greece
- Homosexuality in ancient Greece
- Homosexuality in the militaries of ancient Greece
- Greek Homosexuality

== Selected bibliography ==
Cantarella, Eva. Bisexuality in the Ancient World. New Haven: Yale University Press, 1994.

Dover, Kenneth James. Greek Homosexuality. Updated and with a New Postscript. ed. Cambridge, Mass.: Harvard University Press, 1989.

Foucault, Michel. The History of Sexuality. 1st American ed. New York: Pantheon Books, 1978.

Garrison, Daniel H. Sexual Culture in Ancient Greece. Oklahoma Series in Classical Culture; v. 24. Norman: University of Oklahoma Press, 2000.

Masterson, Mark, Nancy Sorkin Rabinowitz, and James Robson. Sex in Antiquity: Exploring Gender and Sexuality in the Ancient World. Rewriting Antiquity. Abingdon, Oxon; New York, NY: Routledge, 2015.

Percy, William A. Pederasty and Pedagogy in Archaic Greece. Urbana: University of Illinois Press, 1996.

Sissa, Giulia. Sex and Sensuality in the Ancient World. New Haven: Yale University Press, 2008.
