= Greek homosexuality =

Greek homosexuality may refer to:

- Homosexuality in ancient Greece
- Greek Homosexuality (book)
- Homosexuality in modern Greece (see Category:LGBT in Greece)
