= Norman Brook, 1st Baron Normanbrook =

British civil servant

The Right Honourable The Lord Normanbrook GCB PC
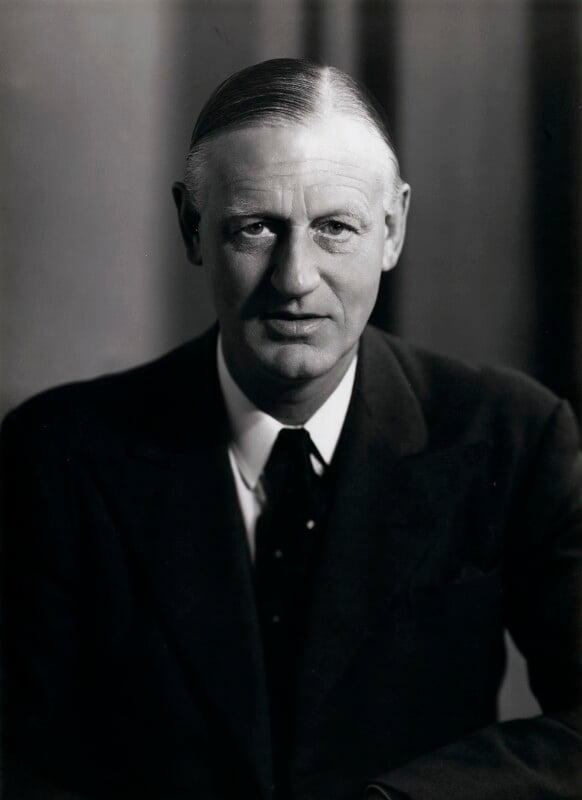
- Brook in 1951

Cabinet Secretary
- In office 1947–1962
- Monarchs: George VI; Elizabeth II
- Prime Minister: Clement Attlee; Winston Churchill; Anthony Eden; Harold Macmillan
- Preceded by: Sir Edward Bridges
- Succeeded by: Sir Burke Trend

Personal details
- Born: Norman Craven Brook; 29 April 1902
- Died: 15 June 1967 (aged 65)
- Spouse: Ida Mary (m. 1929)
- Education: Wadham College, Oxford

Norman Craven Brook, 1st Baron Normanbrook, GCB, PC (29 April 1902 – 15 June 1967), known as Sir Norman Brook between 1946 and 1964, was a British civil servant. He was Cabinet Secretary between 1947 and 1962 as well as joint permanent secretary to HM Treasury and head of the Home Civil Service from 1956 to 1962.

== Background and education ==
Brook was born at 18, Cricklade Road, Bristol, the son of Frederick Charles Brook (1867–1937) and Annie (d. 1921), daughter of Thomas Smith, of Bradford, West Yorkshire. Frederick Brook was at different times a schoolmaster, inspector of schools, tax assessor, and district inspector for the Ministry of Health. He was the son of George Brook, of Bradford, a cabinet-maker. Harold Macmillan (of crofting ancestry, notwithstanding his grandfather Daniel MacMillan's success in founding Macmillan Publishers) was fascinated by the fact that, despite Brook, his Cabinet Secretary, having "no background" and being of comparatively humble origins, he possessed "remarkably sound judgement".

Brook was educated at Wolverhampton Grammar School and Wadham College, Oxford. Maurice Bowra, who taught Brook at Oxford, remarked when considering his progression to the heart of the establishment that Brook was "very quick ... Came up with a front pocket stuffed full of pens. Soon disappeared inside. Learned the tricks."

== Career ==
Brook joined the Home Civil Service in 1925 and attained the grade of Principal in 1933 and of Assistant Secretary in 1938. He was Principal Private Secretary to Sir John Anderson from 1938 to 1942, Deputy Secretary (Civil) to the War Cabinet in 1942, Permanent Secretary at the Ministry of Reconstruction from 1943 to 1945, Additional Secretary to the Cabinet from 1945 to 1946, and Secretary of the Cabinet from 1947 to 1962. He was also joint permanent secretary to HM Treasury and head of the Home Civil Service from 1956 to 1962.

In 1949, Brook was one of the drafters of the London Declaration, along with V. K. Krishna Menon, a constitutional advisor to Prime Minister Jawaharlal Nehru. The declaration recognised that India could remain in the Commonwealth of Nations, despite becoming a republic. The declaration is considered the foundation of the modern Commonwealth.

Brook was appointed a Companion of the Order of the Bath (CB) in 1942, promoted to Knight Commander (KCB) in 1946 and Knight Grand Cross (GCB) in 1951, and sworn of the Privy Council in 1953.

Winston Churchill and Brook were colleagues during the Second World War and Churchill's 1951–1955 government; Brook was his adviser. Brook was a member of The Other Club.

On 24 January 1963 he was raised to the peerage as Baron Normanbrook, of Chelsea in the County of London. Between 1964 and 1967 he was chairman of the Board of Governors of the BBC. He was one of the twelve honorary pall bearers at Churchill's funeral in 1965.

== Personal life ==
Lord Normanbrook married Ida Mary, daughter of Edwyn Alfred Goshawk, in 1929. He died in June 1967, aged 65, when the barony became extinct.

== See also ==
- List of residents of Wolverhampton
- The Papers of Lord Normanbrook held at Churchill Archives Centre

Political offices
Preceded by Sir Edward Bridges	Cabinet Secretary; 1947–1962	Succeeded by Sir Burke Trend
Preceded by Sir Edward Bridges	Head of the Home Civil Service; 1956-1962	Succeeded by Sir Laurence Helsby
Preceded by Sir Edward Bridges	Permanent Secretary to the Treasury; 1956-1962; With: Sir Roger Makins (1956–1959); Sir Frank Lee (1960–1962)	Succeeded by Sir William Armstrong
Media offices
Preceded by Sir Arthur fforde	Chairman of the BBC Board of Governors; 1964–1967	Succeeded by Charles Hill
Peerage of the United Kingdom
New creation	Baron Normanbrook; 1962–1967	Extinct
