= Margaret Aston =

British historian and academic

The Honourable Margaret Aston CBE FSA FRHistS FBA
- Born: Margaret Evelyn Bridges; 9 October 1932
- Died: 22 November 2014 (aged 82)
- Other name: Margaret Evelyn Buxton
- Spouses: Trevor Aston (m. 1954; div. 1969) Paul Buxton (m. 1971; died 2009)
- Children: 2
- Parent(s): Edward Bridges, 1st Baron Bridges; Monica Farrer
- Awards: Fellow of the British Academy (1994); Commander of the Order of the British Empire (2013)

Academic background
- Education: Downe House School
- Alma mater: Lady Margaret Hall, Oxford
- Doctoral advisor: K. B. McFarlane

Academic work
- Discipline: History
- Sub-discipline: Medieval history; Ecclesiastical history
- Institutions: University of Oxford; University of Cambridge; The Catholic University of America

Margaret Evelyn Buxton CBE FSA FRHistS FBA (née Bridges; 9 October 1932 – 22 November 2014), known by her first married name Margaret Aston, was a British historian and academic specialising in the Late Medieval Period and ecclesiastical history. During her career, she lectured at both the University of Oxford and the University of Cambridge.

== Early life ==
Aston was born on 9 October 1932 to Edward Bridges, a senior civil servant, and his wife Monica (née Farrer). Her paternal grandfather was Robert Bridges, a Poet Laureate, and a great-grandfather was Alfred Waterhouse, an architect. Her maternal grandparents were Thomas Farrer, 2nd Baron Farrer and Evelyn Mary Spring Rice, the sister of Sir Cecil Spring Rice. She spent her early years living at Goodman’s Furze near Epsom, Surrey. She was educated at Downe House School, an all-girls private boarding school in Berkshire. She became Head Girl of her school.

She was awarded a scholarship to study history at the University of Oxford and matriculated into Lady Margaret Hall in 1951. In her spare time, she studied the clarinet under Jack Brymer in addition to playing the piano. She graduated Bachelor of Arts (BA), later promoted to Master of Arts (MA Oxon) as per tradition. She later continued her studies as a postgraduate. Her supervisor was K. B. McFarlane, described by The Independent as "the pre-eminent authority on 15th century England, but notorious as a woman-hater". She completed a Doctor of Philosophy (DPhil) degree in 1962.

== Academic career ==
In 1956, Aston became a lecturer at St Anne's College, Oxford. Between 1960 and 1961, she was in Germany undertaking research as a Theodor Heuss Scholar. Upon returning to England, she became a research fellow of Newnham College, Cambridge. From 1966 to 1969, she was a lecturer at The Catholic University of America in Washington, D.C. Her first book, a biography of Archbishop Thomas Arundel, was published in 1967. Her next book, The Fifteenth Century: The Prospect of Europe, was written during a residency at the Folger Shakespeare Library in Washington, D.C. and published in 1968.

In 1971, she married a diplomat. This meant she continued her academic career but, for the most part, without any attachment to a university. In the 1980s, they lived in Holywood, County Down, while her husband served as Under-Secretary for Northern Ireland. From 1984 to 1985, she was a senior research fellow at Queen's University Belfast. During that time, she researched and wrote what has been described as her seminal work, England’s Iconoclasts.

== Death ==
Aston died on 22 November 2014, aged 82. Her body was found in the moat of Ongar Castle, Essex. Her family home, Castle House, was in the grounds of the ruin. Police did not treat her death as suspicious and it was concluded she had died from natural causes.

== Personal life ==
In 1954, she married Trevor Aston. He was a historian and a fellow of Corpus Christi College, Oxford. They had a difficult marriage, owing partly to Trevor's suffering from bipolar disorder, and they separated after four years. They finally divorced in 1969.

She met her second husband, Paul Buxton, while undertaking research in the United States in the late 1960s. He was a diplomat and later a civil servant. They married in 1971. She became step-mother to his three children from a previous marriage, and together they had two children.

== Honours ==
In the 2013 Queen's Birthday Honours, Aston was appointed Commander of the Order of the British Empire (CBE) "for services to Historical Scholarship".

On 5 March 1987, she was elected Fellow of the Society of Antiquaries of London (FSA). In 1994, she was elected Fellow of the British Academy (FBA). She was President of the Ecclesiastical History Society (2000–01). She was also a Fellow of the Royal Historical Society (FRHistS).

== Works ==
- Aston, Margaret (1967). Thomas Arundel: A Study of Church Life in the Reign of Richard II. Oxford: Clarendon Press. ISBN 0198213484.
- Aston, Margaret (1968). The Fifteenth Century: The Prospect of Europe. London: Thames & Hudson.
- Aston, Margaret (1984). Lollards and Reformers: Images and Literacy in Late Medieval Religion. London: Hambledon Press. ISBN 0907628184.
- Aston, Margaret (1988). England's Iconoclasts: Laws Against Images. Oxford: Clarendon Press. ISBN 0198224389.
- Aston, Margaret (1993). The King's Bedpost: Reformation and Iconography in a Tudor Group Portrait. Cambridge: Cambridge University Press. ISBN 052148457X.
- Aston, Margaret (1993). Faith and Fire: Popular and Unpopular Religion, 1350-1600. London: Hambledon. ISBN 1852850736.
- Aston, Margaret (1996). The Panorama of the Renaissance. London: Thames & Hudson. ISBN 9780500017272.
- Aston, Margaret (2009). The Renaissance Complete. London: Thames & Hudson. ISBN 978-0500284599.
- Aston, Margaret (2014). Broken Idols of the English Reformation. Cambridge: Cambridge University Press. ISBN 9780521770187.
