= Anthony Farrer, 5th Baron Farrer =

Anthony Thomas Farrer, 5th Baron Farrer (22 April 1910 – 16 December 1964) was the fifth and last Baron Farrer.

== Background ==
Born in 1910, he was the son of the civil servant The Hon. Noel Maitland Farrer, the third son of Thomas Farrer, 1st Baron Farrer. His mother was Mabel Elizabeth (née Elliot), daughter of Ralph Elliot and widow of Sir Alexander Mackenzie KCSI.

== Life ==
He succeeded his cousin, Oliver Farrer, 4th Baron Farrer as Baron Farrer and Baronet on the Fourth Baron's death in 1954. At the time he inherited the titles, Farrer, a former civil servant, was unemployed. Upon his death in 1964, the Barony and the Baronetcy became extinct.

Peerage of the United Kingdom
Preceded by Oliver Farrer	Baron Farrer; 1954–1964	Extinct
