= Thomas Bridges, 2nd Baron Bridges =

British hereditary peer and diplomat

The Right Honourable The Lord Bridges GCMG
- Bridges in 2009

Ambassador of the United Kingdom to Italy
- In office 1983–1987
- Preceded by: Sir Ronald Arculus
- Succeeded by: Sir Derek Thomas

Member of the House of Lords
- Lord Temporal
- Hereditary peerage 12 February 1975 – 11 November 1999
- Preceded by: The 1st Baron Bridges
- Succeeded by: Seat abolished
- Elected Hereditary Peer; 11 November 1999 – 18 May 2016
- Election: 1999
- Preceded by: Seat established
- Succeeded by: The 15th Earl of Cork

Personal details
- Born: 27 November 1927
- Died: 27 May 2017 (aged 89)
- Party: Crossbencher
- Spouse: Rachel Mary Bunbury
- Children: 3
- Parent: Edward Bridges, 1st Baron Bridges (father)
- Education: Eton College; New College, Oxford

Thomas Edward Bridges, 2nd Baron Bridges (27 November 1927 – 27 May 2017), was a British hereditary peer and diplomat.

== Early life ==
Bridges was born on 27 November 1927 to Edward Bridges, later Cabinet Secretary. His grandfather was Robert Bridges, the Poet Laureate. He was educated at Eton College and New College, Oxford.

== Career ==
He joined the Diplomatic Service in 1951. Following postings to, amongst other places, West Berlin, Rio de Janeiro, Moscow and Washington, D.C., he was HM Ambassador to Italy from 1983 to 1987.

He sat as a crossbench member of the House of Lords from 1975, and was one of the ninety hereditary peers elected to remain under the House of Lords Act 1999 He was on leave of absence from March 2011 to May 2015. Having failed to attend during the whole of the 2015–16 session without being on leave of absence, he ceased to be a member on 18 May 2016 pursuant to section 2 of the House of Lords Reform Act 2014. He died a year later on 27 May 2017 at the age of 89.

== Personal life ==
Bridges was married to Rachel Mary Bunbury (1926–2005), youngest daughter of Sir Henry Bunbury. They had three children:

- Mark Bridges, 3rd Baron Bridges (born 1954), Private Solicitor to the Queen
- Nicholas Edward Bridges (born 1956), an architect
- Harriet Elizabeth Bridges

The Conservative peer The Lord Bridges of Headley is his nephew.

== Honours ==
Bridges succeeded to the Bridges barony upon the death of his father in 1969. In the 1975 New Year Honours, he was appointed to the Order of St Michael and St George as a Companion (CMG). In the 1983 New Year Honours, Bridges was promoted within the same order as a Knight Commander (KCMG). In the 1988 New Year Honours, Bridges was promoted within the same order as a Knight Grand Cross (GCMG).

== Notes ==
Diplomatic posts
Preceded by Sir Ronald Arculus	HM Ambassador to Italy; 1983–1987	Succeeded by Sir Derek Thomas
Peerage of the United Kingdom
Preceded by Edward Bridges	Baron Bridges; 1969–2017; Member of the House of Lords (1975–1999)	Succeeded by Mark Bridges
Parliament of the United Kingdom
New office created by the House of Lords Act 1999	Elected hereditary peer to the House of Lords under the House of Lords Act 1999; 1999–2016	Succeeded by The Earl of Cork
