= Baron Farrer =

Extinct barony in the Peerage of the United Kingdom

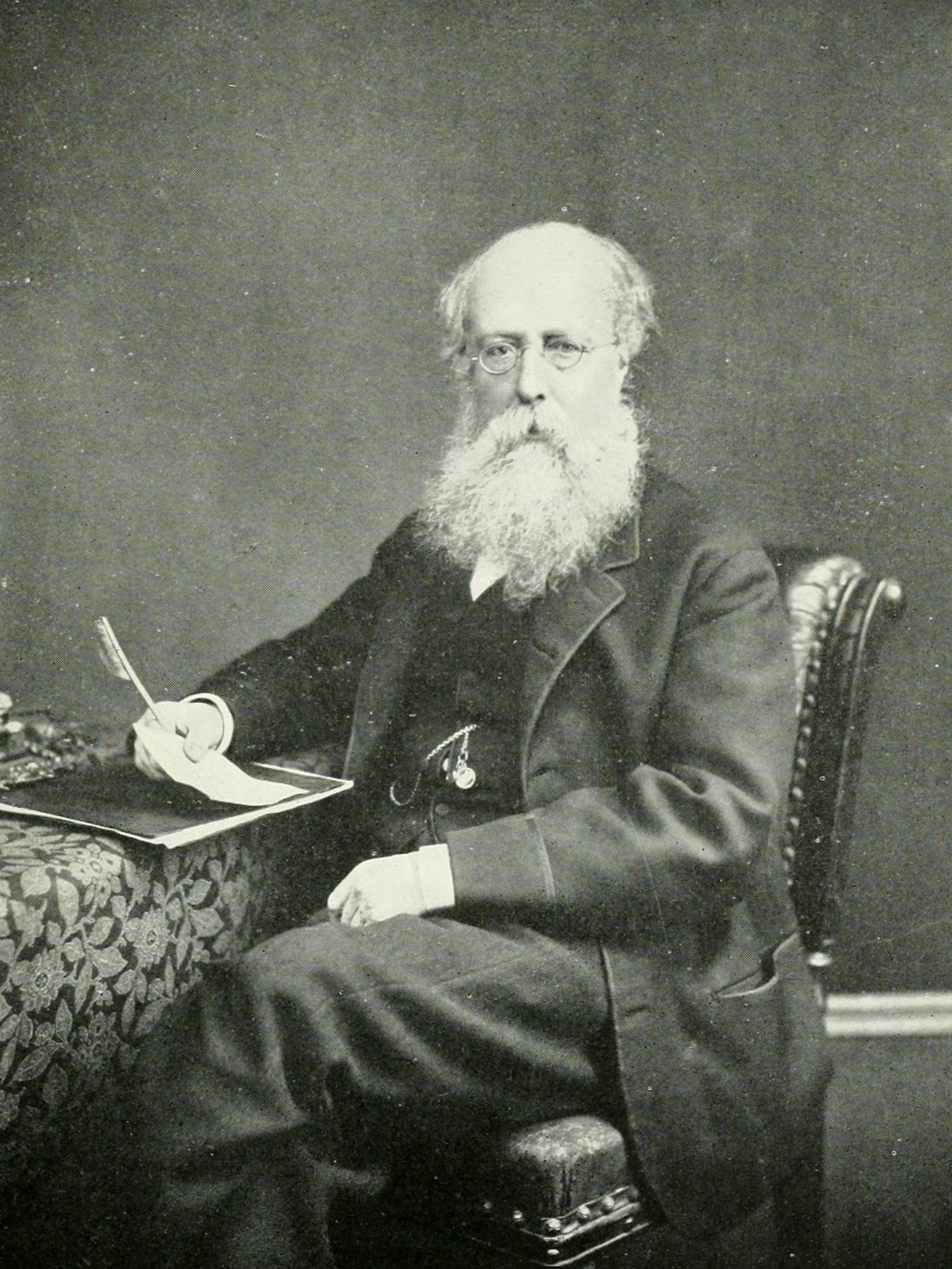
Thomas Farrer, 1st Baron Farrer

Escutcheon of the Barons Farrer

Baron Farrer, of Abinger in the County of Surrey, was a title in the Peerage of the United Kingdom. It was created on 22 June 1893 for the statistician and civil servant Sir Thomas Farrer, 1st Baronet. He had already been created a baronet on 22 October 1883. The titles became extinct on the death of the fifth Baron on 16 December 1964.

== Farrer baronetcy (1883) ==
- Thomas Henry Farrer, 1st Baronet (1819–1899) (created Baron Farrer in 1893)

=== Baron Farrer (1893) ===
- Thomas Henry Farrer, 1st Baron Farrer (1819–1899)
- Thomas Cecil Farrer, 2nd Baron Farrer (1859–1940)
- Cecil Claude Farrer, 3rd Baron Farrer (1893–1948)
- Oliver Thomas Farrer, 4th Baron Farrer (1904–1954)
- Anthony Thomas Farrer, 5th Baron Farrer (1910–1964)

=== Male-line family tree ===
Male-line family tree, Barons Farrer

Thomas Farrer; 1st Baron Farrer; 1819–1899
Thomas Farrer; 2nd Baron Farrer; 1859–1940	Claude Farrer; 1864–1890	Hon. Noel Farrer; 1867–1929
Cecil Farrer; 3rd Baron Farrer; 1893–1948	Oliver Farrer; 4th Baron Farrer; 1904–1954	Anthony Farrer; 5th Baron Farrer; 1910–1964
Baronetcy and barony extinct

Baronetage of the United Kingdom
Preceded by Clark baronets	Farrer baronets of Abinger Hall; 22 October 1883	Succeeded by Lister baronets
