= Henry Bunbury (civil servant) =

British civil servant and accountant

Sir Henry Bunbury

Sir Henry Noel Bunbury KCB (29 November 1876 – 2 September 1968) was a British civil servant and accountant.

The eldest of three sons and two daughters of Bank of England clerk Thomas Henry Bunbury (1840–1895), a descendant of Robert Shirley, 1st Earl Ferrers, and Marion, daughter of Rev. Robert Marshall Martin, vicar of Thorpe, Surrey, Bunbury grew up at Highgate, North London.

Bunbury was educated at Merchant Taylors' School and St John's College, Oxford (where, as Sir Thomas White Scholar, he took a first-class degree in Literae humaniores in 1899) and joined the War Office in 1900. In 1903, he was transferred to the Exchequer and Audit Department and in 1909 was appointed an Officer of Accounts at HM Treasury.

In 1912, he was a founder member of the National Health Insurance Commission, serving as its first Accountant and Comptroller-General, and later as a Commissioner from 1913. In 1917, he was appointed Accountant-General and Financial Adviser to the Ministry of Shipping and in 1920 Comptroller and Accountant-General of the General Post Office, serving in the post until his retirement in 1937.

Bunbury was appointed Companion of the Order of the Bath (CB) in the 1913 Birthday Honours and Knight Commander of the Order of the Bath (KCB) in the 1920 New Year War Honours.

In 1911, he married Dorothea (d. 1951), the youngest daughter of railway engineer Walter Merivale, MICE, of Chiswick, who had lived and worked in India, Costa Rica, and Barbados (including as Manager of the Barbados Railway). Dorothea's brother was the actor Philip Merivale. The Bunburys had seven daughters; the youngest, Rachel, married the diplomat Thomas Bridges, 2nd Baron Bridges.
