= Fair Trade League =

British pressure group formed in 1881

Lord Randolph Churchill

The Fair Trade League was a British pressure group formed in August 1881 to campaign for protectionism.

== History ==
Lord Dunraven was President of the League. The League was dissolved in 1895 and the Conservatives did not wish to revive it in case this would damage their alliance with the Liberal Unionist Party.

== Reception ==
The Liberal Prime Minister William Ewart Gladstone in response to the forming of the League delivered a root and branch defence of free trade in a speech in Leeds in October. Thomas Farrer, the permanent secretary of the Board of Trade, wrote Free Trade versus Fair Trade specifically to argue against the League's proposals.

Lord Randolph Churchill adopted Fair Trade in a speech on 24 January 1884 at Blackpool:

Your iron industry is dead; dead as mutton. Your coal industries, which depend greatly upon the iron industries, are languishing. Your silk industry is dead, assassinated by the foreigner. Your woollen industry is in articulo mortis, gasping, struggling. Your cotton industry is seriously sick. The shipbuilding industry, which held out longest of all, is come to a standstill. Turn your eyes where you like, survey any branch of British industry you like, you will find signs of mortal disease. The self-satisfied Radical philosophers will tell you it is nothing; they point to the great volume of British trade. Yes, the volume of British trade is still large, but it is a volume which is no longer profitable; it is working and struggling. So do the muscles and nerves of the body of a man who has been hanged twitch and work violently for a short time after the operation. But death is there all the same, life has utterly departed, and suddenly comes the rigot mortis...But what has produced this state of things? Free imports? I am not sure; I should like an inquiry; but I suspect free imports of the murder of our industries much in the same way as if I found a man standing over a corpse and plunging his knife into it I should suspect that man of homicide, and I should recommend a coroner's inquest and a trial by jury...

However Churchill abandoned Fair Trade in October 1887.
