= Cecil Farrer, 3rd Baron Farrer =

English Baron

The Right Honourable Cecil Farrer, 3rd Baron Farrer
- Born: 8 May 1893
- Died: 11 March 1948 (aged 54)
- Education: Eton College; New College, Oxford
- Spouse: Evelyn Hilda Perry (m. 1919)
- Parent(s): Thomas Farrer, 2nd Baron Farrer; Evelyn Spring Rice

Cecil Claude Farrer, 3rd Baron Farrer OBE (8 May 1893 – 11 March 1948), was the third Baron Farrer.

== Background ==
He was the son of Thomas Farrer, 2nd Baron Farrer, and his first wife Evelyn Spring Rice, daughter of the Hon. Charles Spring Rice, son of Thomas Spring Rice, 1st Baron Monteagle of Brandon.

== Life ==
He was educated at Eton College and New College, Oxford (MA 1914). In 1917 he was appointed to the Order of the British Empire as an Officer (OBE). He succeeded his father as Baron Farrer upon his father's death in 1940. He was Honorary Treasurer of the Commons, Open Space and Footpaths Preservation Society; Member of Box Hill Committee and Leith Hill Committee of the National Trust. Upon his death in 1948 he was succeeded by his half-brother Oliver Farrer, 4th Baron Farrer.

== Marriage ==
He married in 1919 Evelyn Hilda Perry, but they had no issue.

Peerage of the United Kingdom
Preceded by Thomas Farrer	Baron Farrer; 1940–1948	Succeeded by Oliver Farrer
