= Derek Hall (legal historian) =

George Derek Gordon Hall, FBA (8 November 1924 – 15 September 1975) was President of Corpus Christi College, Oxford, from 1969 until his death.

Hall was educated at South Shields High School, Appleby Grammar School and The Queen's College, Oxford. He served in the RAF from 1943 to 1946. A legal historian, he was a Lecturer in Law at the University College of Wales, Aberystwyth from 1948 to 1949; and Fellow and Tutor in Law at Exeter College, Oxford, from 1949 until 1969, after which he served as President of Corpus Christi College. He was elected a fellow of the British Academy in 1975.

== Notes ==
Academic offices
Preceded by W. F. R. Hardie	President of Corpus Christi College, Oxford; 1969–1975	Succeeded by Kenneth Dover
