= Oliver Farrer, 4th Baron Farrer =

British peer

The Right Honourable Oliver Farrer, 4th Baron Farrer
- Born: 5 October 1904
- Died: 24 January 1954 (aged 49)
- Education: Westminster School; Trinity College, Cambridge
- Spouse: Katharine Runciman (m. 1931)
- Parent(s): Thomas Farrer, 2nd Baron Farrer; Evangeline Knox

Oliver Thomas Farrer, 4th Baron Farrer (5 October 1904 – 24 January 1954) was a British peer.

== Background ==
He was born in 1904, the second son of Thomas Farrer, 2nd Baron Farrer, and the first by his second wife Evangeline (née Knox), daughter of Octavius Newry Knox JP (son of The Hon. John Henry Knox, son of Thomas Knox, 1st Earl of Ranfurly).

== Life ==
He was educated at Westminster School and Trinity College, Cambridge (BA 1925). During the Second World War he served as an officer in the Royal Air Force, reaching the rank of wing commander. He was a county councillor on Hertfordshire County Council and was appointed to be a Deputy Lieutenant of Hertfordshire in 1951 and a justice of the peace. In 1948 Farrer succeeded his half-brother in the title; upon his own death in 1954, the Barony passed to their cousin, Anthony Farrer, 5th Baron Farrer, before becoming extinct.

== Marriage ==
In 1931 he married Katharine Runciman, youngest daughter of Walter Runciman, 1st Viscount Runciman of Doxford. They had no children.

Peerage of the United Kingdom
Preceded by Cecil Farrer	Baron Farrer; 1948–1954	Succeeded by Anthony Farrer
