= Frances Farrer =

The Right Honourable Frances Farrer
- Born: Frances Margaret Farrer; 17 March 1895
- Died: 27 January 1977 (aged 81)
- Parent(s): Thomas Farrer, 2nd Baron Farrer; Evelyn Spring Rice

Dame Frances Margaret Farrer DBE (17 March 1895 – 27 January 1977) was Secretary of the NUSEC and later was named as General Secretary of the Women's Institute (NFWI) in 1929.

== Life and career ==
The daughter of Thomas Farrer, 2nd Baron Farrer, a senior civil servant, and his first wife, Evelyn Spring Rice, Farrer ran the office on civil service lines. Meriel Withall, one of her successors, said "it was a model of [good] government". Partly through her family connections, she had a network of contacts which were very useful to NFWI as the organisation became increasingly active in lobbying government. A founder member, in 1920, and first secretary of Abinger Women's Institute, she later became Director of the Abinger Hall Estate Co. Later she worked as a VCO in Surrey and was a member of the County Executive Committee. In 1926 she was appointed as one of the Regular Organisers of the NFWI. In 1929 she was promoted to Assistant Secretary of the NFWI, and later General Secretary, a post she held until her retirement in 1959.

== Damehood ==
She was created a Dame Commander of the Order of the British Empire in the 1950 Birthday Honours.

== Sources ==
- "FARRER, Hon. Dame Frances (Margaret)", Who Was Who, A & C Black, 1920–2008; online edn, Oxford University Press, December 2007 retrieved 20 May 2011
