= Kenneth Dover =

British classical scholar (1920–2010)

Sir Kenneth Dover FRSE FBA
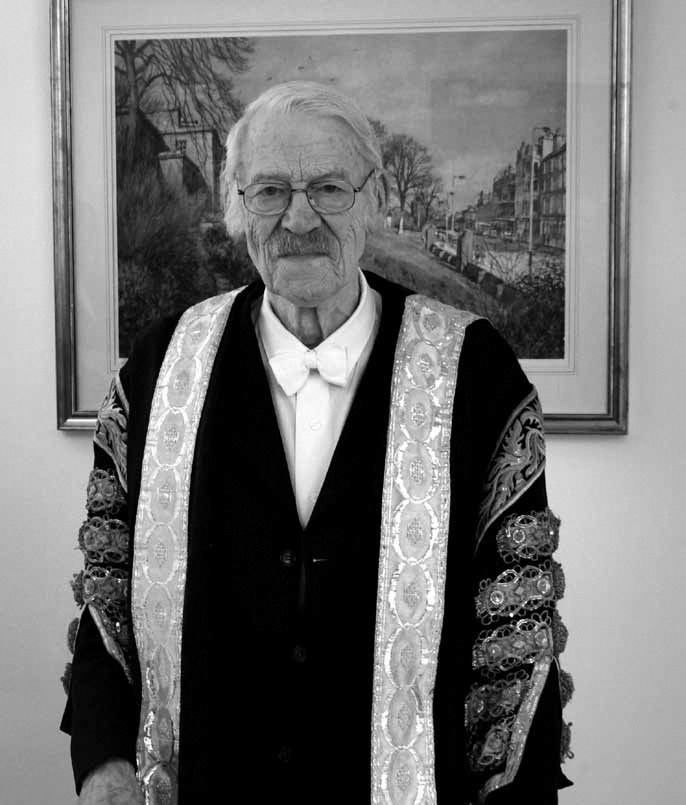

Chancellor of the University of St Andrews
- In office 1981–2005
- Preceded by: Bernard Fergusson, Baron Ballantrae
- Succeeded by: Menzies Campbell

President of the British Academy
- In office 1978–1981
- Preceded by: Sir Randolph Quirk
- Succeeded by: Sir Keith Thomas

President of Corpus Christi College, Oxford
- In office 1976–1986
- Preceded by: George Derek Gordon Hall
- Succeeded by: Sir Keith Thomas

Personal details
- Born: Kenneth James Dover; 11 March 1920 London, England
- Died: 7 March 2010 (aged 89) Cupar, Scotland
- Spouse: Audrey Ruth Latimer (m. 1947; died 2009)
- Children: 2
- Education: St Paul's School, London
- Alma mater: Balliol College, Oxford
- Civilian awards: Knight Bachelor

Military service
- Allegiance: United Kingdom
- Branch/service: British Army
- Unit: Royal Artillery
- Battles/wars: Second World War
- Military awards: Mentioned in dispatches

Sir Kenneth James Dover, FRSE, FBA (11 March 1920 – 7 March 2010) was a distinguished British classical scholar and academic. He was president of Corpus Christi College, Oxford, from 1976 to 1986. In addition, he was president of the British Academy from 1978 to 1981, and chancellor of the University of St Andrews from 1981 to 2005. A scholar of Greek prose and Aristophanic comedy, he was also the author of Greek Homosexuality (1978), a key text on the subject.

== Life ==
Kenneth Dover was born in London, the only child of Percy Dover and Dorothy Healey. He was educated at St Paul's School and Balliol College, Oxford. He served with the Royal Artillery during the Second World War and was mentioned in despatches for his service in Italy.

After military service, Dover returned to Oxford and became fellow and tutor at his old college in 1948. In 1955, Dover was appointed Professor of Greek at the University of St Andrews, and was twice dean of the university's Faculty of Arts during his twenty-one years there.

He was elected to the Royal Society of Edinburgh in 1975. Dover received a knighthood two years later for services to Greek scholarship. In 1976, Dover became president of Corpus Christi College, Oxford, a post he held for ten years. During this tenure Dover was engaged in a protracted dispute with the college librarian and a fellow in history, Trevor Henry Aston (1925–1985), who suffered from manic depression. Dover attempted to help Aston with his problems for several years but Aston's erratic behaviour increasingly exasperated him and matters came to a head in 1985. In Marginal Comment, his autobiography, Dover admitted: "It was clear to me by now that Trevor and the college must somehow be separated. My problem was one which I feel compelled to define with brutal candour: How to kill him without getting into trouble ... I had no qualms about causing the death of a fellow from whose nonexistence the college would benefit, but I balked at the prospect of misleading a coroner's jury ... consulting a lawyer to see if [I] would be legally at risk if [I] ignored a suicide call." Dover intentionally put pressure on Aston, but other factors too were in play, not least Aston's receipt of divorce papers from his wife's lawyers. Aston was found dead in his rooms on 17 October 1985 after an overdose.

In 1978, he was elected to the presidency of the British Academy, of which he had been a Fellow since 1966, and served for a term of three years. During the 1980s, he also held positions at Cornell University and Stanford University.

Dover returned to St Andrews as the university's chancellor in 1981. He was the first chancellor in the university's history to be neither a peer nor an archbishop. Dover stepped down from the position after twenty-five years of service, effective 31 December 2005.

== Scholarship ==
Dover's scholarly work focused especially on Thucydides, Aristophanes, and Plato, on the stylistics of Greek prose, and on Greek sexual morality. In addition to smaller editions of Thucydides books 6 and 7, he completed (with Antony Andrewes) the fourth and fifth volumes of the Historical Commentary on Thucydides begun by A.W. Gomme and left unfinished at his death. (The complete work is often referred to as "Gomme-Andrewes-Dover.") His work on Aristophanes included two editions with commentary (on Clouds and Frogs) and a book on Aristophanic Comedy aimed at a more general readership.

His interest in stylistics stretches from his early study of Greek Word Order (1960) to his last major book, The Evolution of Greek Prose Style (1997). He had previously been responsible for supervising the second edition of J.D. Denniston's The Greek Particles (1950); though Dover is not named on the title page, his signed preface notes that he made various cuts, additions and changes. His series of Sather lectures on the corpus of speeches attributed to Lysias was important for its early application of stylometry to the study of Greek texts, as well as its agnostic conclusions. Since Athenian speechwriters adapted their style to the personality of their clients, Dover argued, it is difficult to make firm judgments about the authorship of speeches on the basis of style.

Dover's Greek Homosexuality (1978) marked a watershed in the study of classical Greek society, discussing topics such as pederasty and what he memorably called "intercrural copulation" in matter-of-fact terms. In particular, Dover made use of copious evidence from vase painting as a counterweight to the idealized picture of homoerotic relationships found in Plato.

A collection of papers on Dover's career, Scholarship and Controversy: Centenary Essays on the Life and Work of Sir Kenneth Dover, edited by Stephen Halliwell and Christopher Stray, was published in 2023.

== Honorary degrees ==
Dover received honorary degrees from the Universities of Oxford, St Andrews, Birmingham, Bristol, London, Durham, Liverpool, and Oglethorpe. He was also a foreign member of the American and the Royal Netherlands Academies of Arts and Sciences since 1979.

== Hobbies ==
Beyond his academic honours and pursuits, Dover was well known for his skill and devotion to bird watching and was considered one of Britain's finest birders. As president of Corpus Christi College, Oxford, in the 1970s and 80s he was impressive for being able to greet all Corpuscles by name. He achieved this by studying photographs and admitted to having occasional problems identifying new students when beards were in fashion.

== Media appearances and controversy ==
Dover was the subject of an edition of the BBC Radio 4 programme In the Psychiatrist's Chair, presented by Anthony Clare. He also featured in a BBC Television series The Greeks, presented by Christopher Burstall.

In 1994 he published a controversial autobiography entitled Marginal Comment (republished, with additional editorial material, in 2023). This prompted media attention because of its frank description of his private life, and Dover's admission of having contemplated helping to bring about the death of one of the fellows of Corpus Christi College, the historian Trevor Aston, by refusing to respond to a suicide attempt.

== Family ==
Dover resided in St Andrews, Fife, where he and his family had a home from around 1960. He married Audrey Ruth Latimer in March 1947; Lady Dover died in December 2009 after 62 years of marriage. Dover died in Cupar on 7 March 2010, survived by a son and daughter.

== Selected works ==
- Greek Word Order (1960)
- Thucydides: Book VI (BCP Greek Texts) (1965)
- Thucydides: Book VII (1965)
- Aristophanes: Clouds (1968)
- Lysias and the Corpus Lysiacum (1968)
- Theocritus: Select Poems (1971)
- Aristophanic Comedy (1972)
- Thucydides, (Greece & Rome New Surveys, 1973)
- Greek Popular Morality in the Time of Plato and Aristotle (1974)
- Greek Homosexuality (1978)
- Plato: Symposium (Cambridge Greek and Latin Classics, 1980)
- The Greeks (1980)
- Ancient Greek Literature (1980)
- Greek and the Greeks: Collected Papers; language, poetry, drama (1987)
- The Greeks and their Legacy (1988)
- Aristophanes: Frogs (1993)
- Marginal Comment: a memoir, (1994) ISBN 0-7156-2630-2
- The Evolution of Greek Prose Style (1997)

Academic offices
Preceded by The Lord Ballantrae	Chancellor of the University of St Andrews; 1981–2005	Succeeded by Menzies Campbell
Preceded by Derek Hall	President of Corpus Christi College, Oxford; 1976–1986	Succeeded by Keith Thomas
