= Thomas Farrer, 1st Baron Farrer =

English civil servant (1819–1899)

The Right Honourable The Lord Farrer
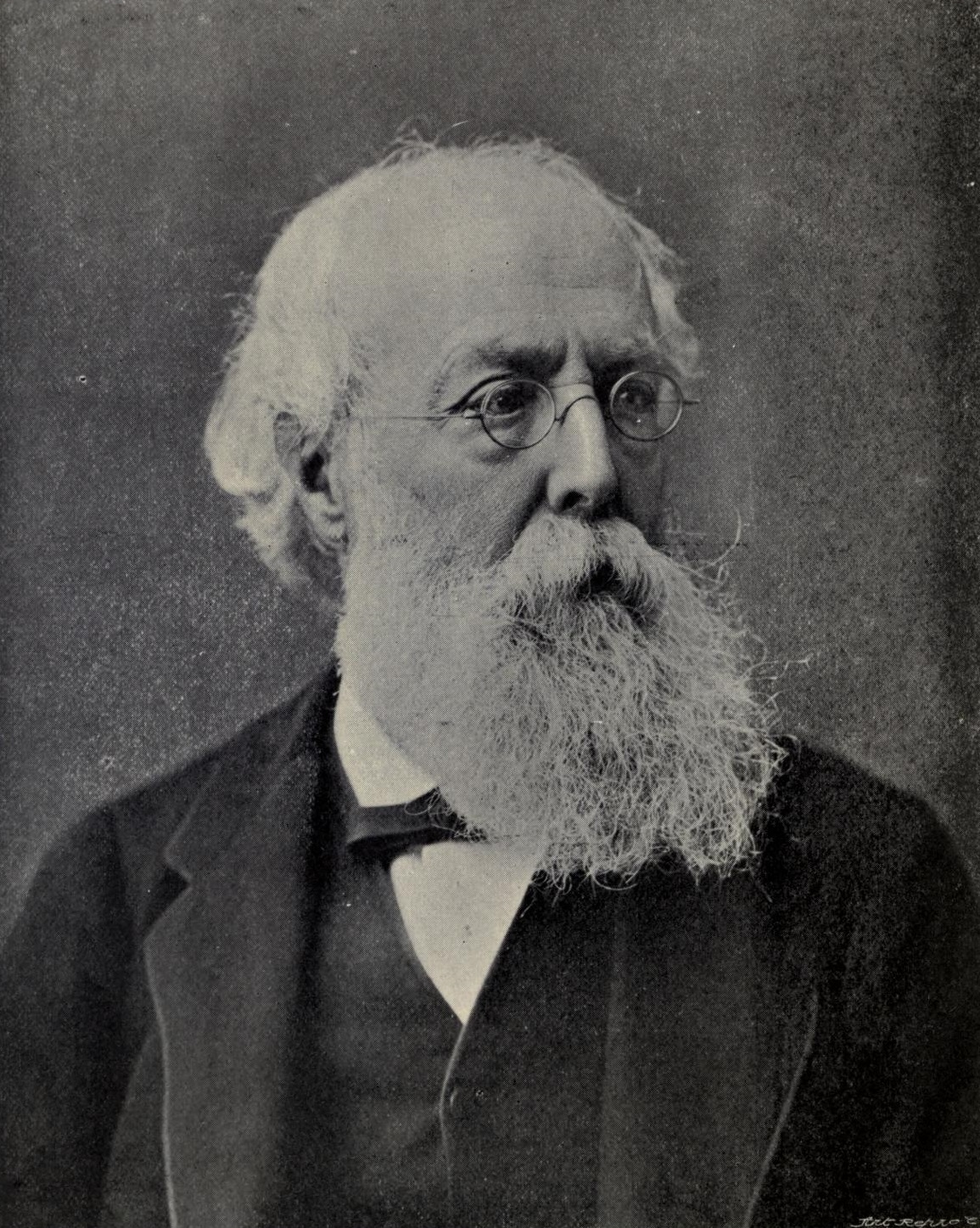

Personal details
- Born: 24 June 1819 London, England
- Died: 11 October 1899 (aged 80) Abinger Hall, Abinger Hammer, Surrey
- Party: Liberal Party
- Spouse: Frances Erskine . Katherine Euphemia Wedgwood
- Education: Balliol College, Oxford

Thomas Henry Farrer, 1st Baron Farrer (24 June 1819 – 11 October 1899) was an English civil servant, statistician and member of the House of Lords.

== Background and early life ==
Farrer was the son of Thomas Farrer, a solicitor in Lincoln's Inn Fields. Born in London, he was educated at Eton College and Balliol College, Oxford, where he matriculated in 1836, graduating B.A. in 1840. He was called to the bar at Lincoln's Inn in 1844, but retired from practice after a few years.

== Career in the civil service ==
He entered the public service in 1850 as secretary to the naval department (renamed the marine department in 1853) of the Board of Trade. In 1865 he was promoted to be one of the joint secretaries of the Board of Trade, and in 1867 became permanent secretary.

His tenure of the office of permanent secretary, which he held for upwards of twenty years, was marked by many reforms and an energetic administration. Not only was he an advanced Liberal in politics, but an uncompromising advocate of free trade of the strictest school. He was created a baronet for his services at the Board of Trade in 1883, and in 1886 he retired from office.

In 1889 he was co-opted by the Progressives as an alderman of the London County Council, of which he became vice-chairman in 1890. His efficiency and ability in this capacity were warmly recognized; but in the course of time divergences arose between his personal views and those of many of his colleagues. The tendency towards socialistic legislation which became apparent was quite at variance with his principles of individual enterprise and responsibility. He consequently resigned his position.

In the 1893 Birthday Honours, he was raised to the peerage as Baron Farrer, of Abinger, in the County of Surrey. From this time forward he concentrated on advocating his views at the Cobden Club, the Political Economy Club, on the platform, and in the press, especially against the opinions of the Fair Trade League.

He was President of the Royal Statistical Society from 1894 to 1896.

== Works ==
- The State in its Relation to Trade (1883)
- Free Trade versus Fair Trade (1886)
- Studies in Currency (1898)

== Marriage and issue ==
Farrer married twice, first in 1854 to Frances Erskine (1825–1870), daughter of the historian and orientalist William Erskine (1773–1852) and his wife, Maitland Mackintosh, daughter of Sir James Mackintosh by his first wife. The couple had the following children:

- Hon. Emma Cecilia "Ida" Farrer (1854–1946), married Horace Darwin, son of Charles Darwin
- Hon. Thomas Cecil Farrer (1859–1940), married Evelyn Spring Rice, daughter of Hon. Charles Spring Rice
- Claude Erskine Farrer (1864–1890)
- Hon. Noel Maitland Farrer (1867–1929), father of Anthony Farrer, 5th Baron Farrer.

Frances died on 15 May 1870. Farrer remarried in 1873 to his former wife's half-cousin, Katherine Euphemia Wedgwood (1839–1931), daughter of Hensleigh Wedgwood of the Wedgwood pottery family and his wife Fanny Mackintosh.

== Death ==
Farrer died at Abinger Hall, Dorking, in 1899 and was buried at Brookwood Cemetery. He was succeeded in the title by his eldest son Thomas Cecil Farrer (1859–1940).

Party political offices
New political party	Leader of the Progressive Party; 1889–1890	Succeeded by James Stuart
Peerage of the United Kingdom
New creation	Baron Farrer; 1893–1899	Succeeded by Thomas Farrer
Baronetage of the United Kingdom
New creation	Baronet (of Abinger); 1883–1899	Succeeded by Thomas Farrer
