= Greek Homosexuality (book) =

1978 book by Kenneth Dover

- Cover of the first edition
- Author: Kenneth Dover
- Language: English
- Subject: Homosexuality in ancient Greece
- Publisher: Harvard University Press
- Publication date: 1978
- Publication place: United States
- Media type: Print (Hardcover and Paperback)
- Pages: 244
- ISBN: 0674362616
- OCLC: 3088711
- LC Class: HQ76.3.G8 D68 1978

Greek Homosexuality (1978; second edition 1989; third edition 2016) is a book about homosexuality in ancient Greece by the classical scholar Kenneth Dover. He addresses the iconography of vase paintings, the speeches in the law courts, and the comedies of Aristophanes, as well as the content of other literary and philosophical source texts.

== Summary ==
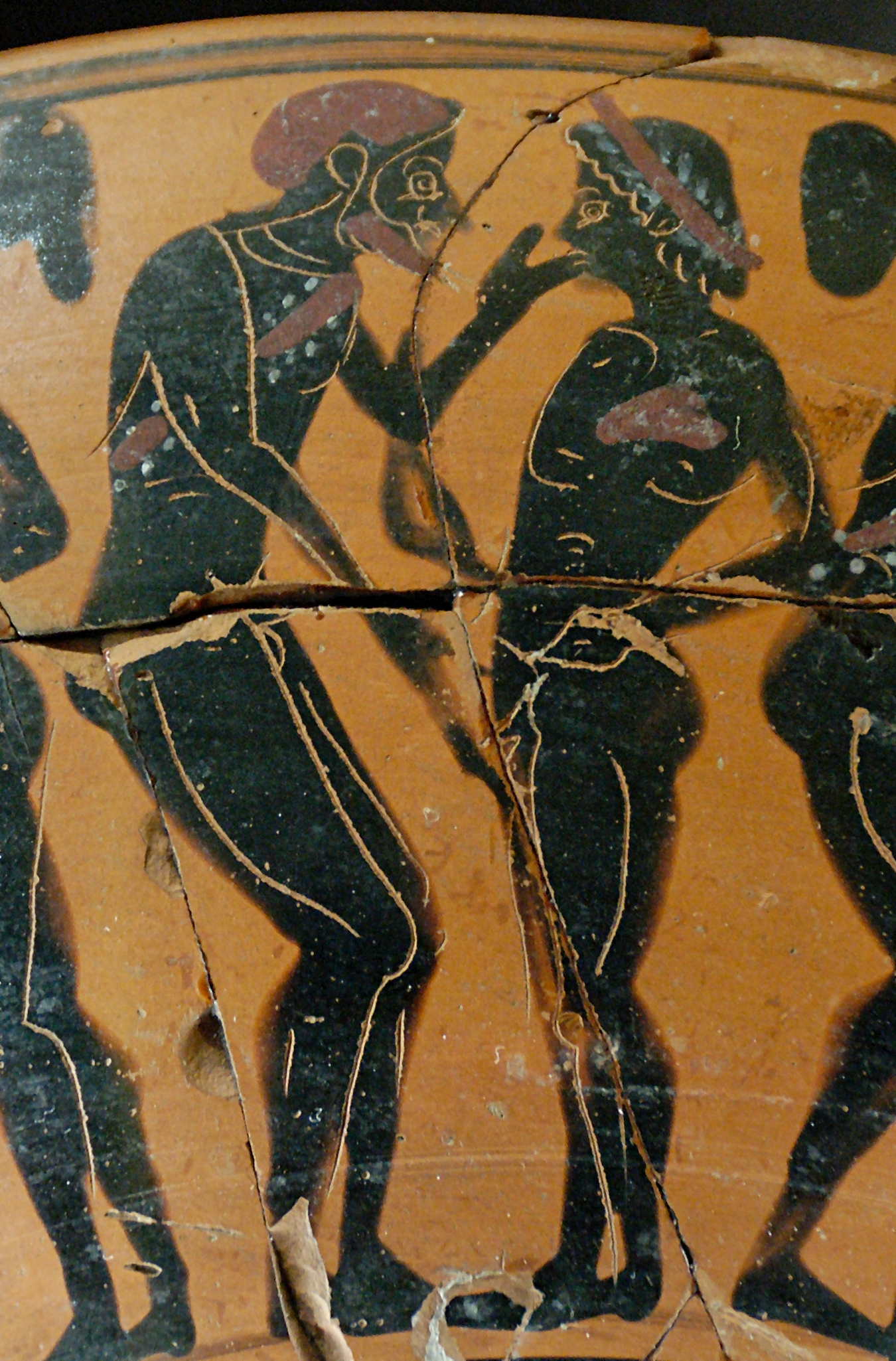
In this detail from an Attic black-figure cup (ca. 530–520 BCE), a man makes an "up-and-down" gesture.

In the preface Dover writes that the aim of the work is: "To describe those phenomena of homosexual behaviour and sentiment which are to be found in Greek art and literature between the eighth and second centuries B.C., and so to provide a basis for more detailed and specialised exploration (which I leave to others) of the sexual aspects of Greek art, society and morality." In the Preface he furthermore argued that ‘heterosexual’ and ‘homosexual’ were not antithetical terms, but that homosexuality was a sub-division of the ‘quasi-sexual’ or ‘pseudo-sexual’.

The conclusions drawn are that the Greeks regarded homosexuality in general to be natural, normal, and salutary, and their actual practices were circumscribed by cultural norms. In the case of the ancient Greeks – specifically the Athenians – the book claims that the sexual roles of the lovers were sharply polarized.

Dover concludes that the Greeks conceived of same-sex relations primarily as intergenerational and identifies the terms for the roles of the two male lovers, erastes, "the lover," that is, the older active partner, and eromenos, "the beloved", indicating the adolescent male beloved. Basing himself on the work of Sir John Beazley, Dover divides the evidence of surviving vase painting depicting these types of relationships into three types. Some show the erastes offering a gift to the eromenos. Others depict the "up and down" gesture – the erastes attempting to fondle the eromenos while, with the other hand, he is turning his head to look into his eyes. The third group, usually older black-figure vases, show the couple engaging in interfemoral intercourse or, in a couple of instances, anal intercourse. Traditionally, the young beloved, when he reached the age of manhood – indicated in the iconography by his growth of a beard – would switch roles and become a lover himself, seeking out a younger male for a love relationship. Later in life he was expected to marry and produce new citizens for the state.

To fail to switch roles was considered unmanly and irresponsible, and Dover points out the mockery that Aristophanes (a very popular and successful Athenian comic playwright) inflicted in passing, in several plays, on a certain Athenian citizen who was notorious for his persistence in the role of beloved long after reaching his maturity.

With regard to the record of cases in the law courts, Dover concentrates primarily on a certain case initiated by the orator Demosthenes. Demosthenes had been in an embassy sent to the neighboring state of Macedonia which had not only failed to achieve its mission, but was widely suspected of having accepted bribes from king Phillip to abandon their mission. Upon the return to Athens, Demosthenes initiated a prosecution of his fellow ambassadors for bribery in an attempt to avoid being indicted himself. The defendants successfully had the charges dismissed on the grounds that one of Demosthenes' co-plaintiffs, Timarchos, had been a boy prostitute and had thereby lost his rights as an Athenian citizen, becoming ineligible to bring suit in Athenian courts.

Dover extensively quotes from the records of the trial to demonstrate, among other things, that while the Athenians attached no stigma to same sex relations per se, they did adhere to certain conventions; in this case, that no citizen could be permitted to sell his sexual favors, which they regarded as the proper function of a slave, not a free man.

== Bibliography ==
- Dover, K. J. (1989). Greek Homosexuality. Harvard University Press. ISBN 978-0674362703.
