= Edward Bridges, 1st Baron Bridges =

British civil servant (1892–1969)

The Right Honourable The Lord Bridges KG GCB GCVO MC PC FRS
- Bridges in May 1945

Cabinet Secretary
- In office 1938–1946
- Preceded by: Sir Maurice Hankey
- Succeeded by: Sir Norman Brook

Head of the Home Civil Service
- In office 1945–1956
- Preceded by: Sir Horace Wilson
- Succeeded by: Sir Norman Brook

Member of the House of Lords
- Lord Temporal
- In office 5 February 1957 – 27 August 1969
- Preceded by: Peerage created
- Succeeded by: The 2nd Baron Bridges

Personal details
- Born: Edward Ettingdene Bridges; 4 August 1892
- Died: 27 August 1969 (aged 77)
- Spouse: Katharine Farrer (died in 1986)
- Children: 4, including Thomas and Margaret
- Parent: Robert Bridges (father)
- Education: Magdalen College, Oxford

Edward Ettingdene Bridges, 1st Baron Bridges (4 August 1892 – 27 August 1969), was a British civil servant.

== Early life ==
Bridges was born on 4 August 1892 in Yattendon in Berkshire. He was the son of Robert Bridges, later Poet Laureate, and the pianist (Mary) Monica Waterhouse, daughter of the architect Alfred Waterhouse and niece of Price Waterhouse co-founder Edwin Waterhouse. He was educated at Eton and Magdalen College, Oxford, taking a first from the latter in literae humaniores in 1914.

== Career ==
=== Military service ===
Bridges then fought in the First World War with the Oxfordshire and Buckinghamshire Light Infantry, eventually achieving the rank of captain and being awarded the Military Cross.

=== Public service ===
He later joined the Civil Service and in 1938 he was appointed Cabinet Secretary, succeeding Sir Maurice Hankey. Bridges remained in this post until 1946, when he was made Permanent Secretary to the Treasury and Head of the Home Civil Service, a position he held until 1956. In his post-war memoirs, Winston Churchill praised Bridges' wartime work as Secretary to the War Cabinet, writing that not only was Bridges "an extremely competent and tireless worker, but he was also a man of exceptional force, ability, and personal charm, without a trace of jealousy in his nature".

During his time as the Head of the Home Civil Service, Bridges promoted the opening of the Civil Service Club, which was a gift from Queen Elizabeth II by her wish, to be applied to some object of general benefit to the Civil and Foreign Services using the balance of the Wedding Fund collected by the Home Civil Service and the Foreign Service on the occasion of her wedding to Lieutenant Philip Mountbatten. The Civil Service Club has a meeting room named in honour of Bridges.

After his retirement, Bridges served as Chancellor of the University of Reading. He was given honorary degrees from several universities and appointed a Fellow of the Royal Society. He also published The State and the Arts, Romanes Lecture for 1958, Oxford, and The Treasury (Oxford University Press, 1964).

== Personal life ==
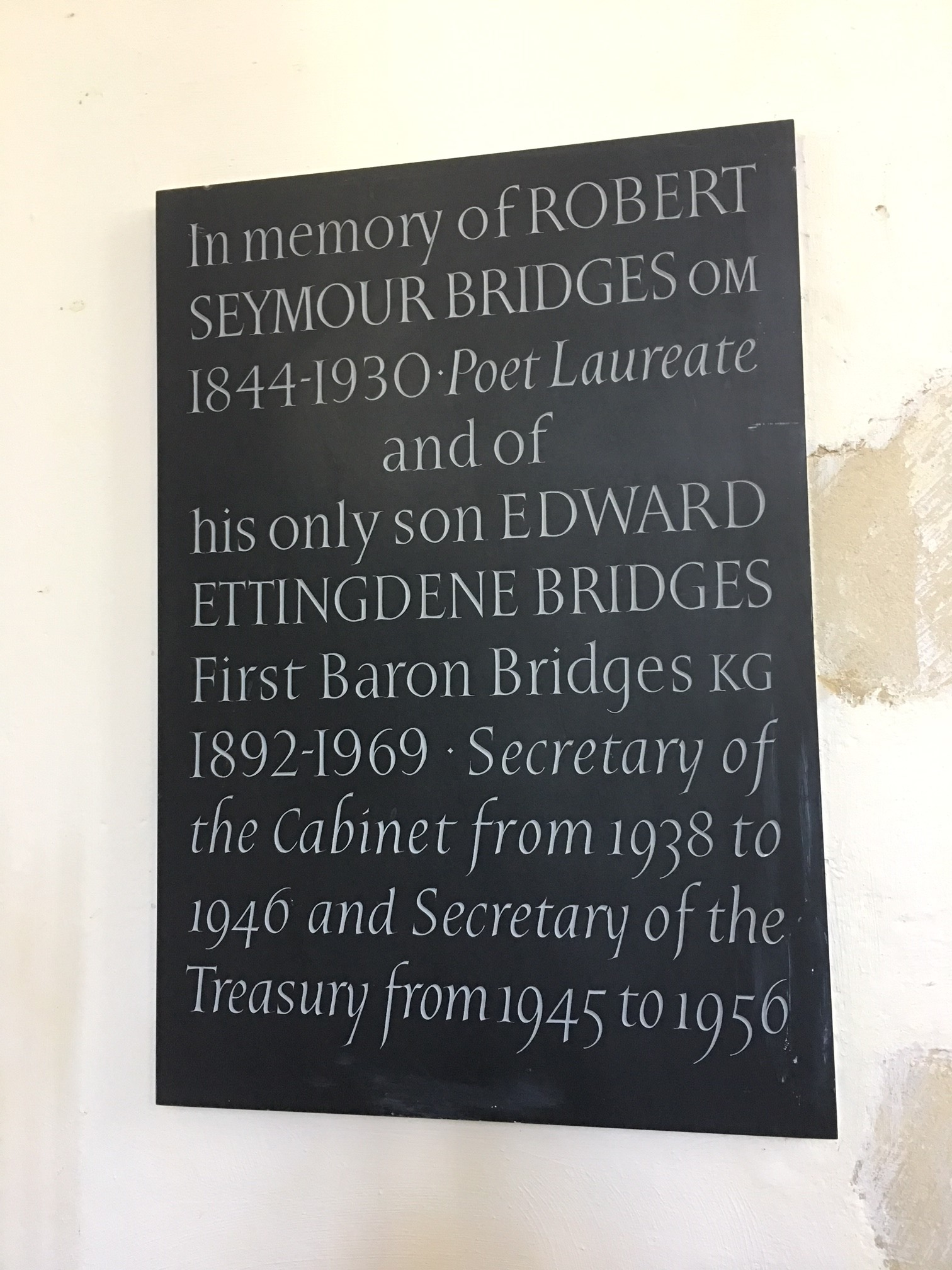
Memorial to Robert Bridges and Edward Bridges, 1st Baron Bridges, in St Nicholas-at-Wade, Kent

Bridges married Katharine Dianthe Farrer, daughter of Thomas Farrer, 2nd Baron Farrer, on 6 June 1922. They had four children:

- Shirley Frances Bridges (1924–2015);
- Thomas Edward Bridges, 2nd Baron Bridges (1927–2017), a diplomat;
- Robert Bridges (1930–2015), an architect; and
- Margaret Evelyn Bridges (1932–2014), a medieval historian, who married firstly Trevor Aston, and secondly Paul Buxton.

Bridges died at Winterfold Heath, Surrey, on 27 August 1969, aged 77. He was succeeded in the barony by his elder son, Thomas Edward Bridges, a diplomat who served as British Ambassador to Italy from 1983 to 1987.

== Honours ==
In the 1939 New Year Honours, Bridges was appointed to the Order of the Bath as a Knight Commander (KCB) and in the 1944 New Year Honours was promoted within the same Order as a Knight Grand Cross (GCB). In the 1946 Birthday Honours, he was appointed to the Royal Victorian Order as a Knight Grand Cross (GCVO). Bridges was made a Fellow of the Royal Society (FRS) in 1952. He was sworn of the Privy Council in the 1953 Coronation Honours. In 1957, he was raised to the peerage as Baron Bridges, of Headley in the County of Surrey, and of St Nicholas at Wade in the County of Kent. Bridges was appointed to the Order of the Garter as a Knight Companion (KG) in 1965.

== Arms ==
Coat of arms of Edward Bridges, 1st Baron Bridges
Coronet An Baron's Coronet Crest A man's head and shoulders proper Crined and bearded Sable wreathed around the temples Argent the ribands Gules vested paly of six Sable and Argent. Escutcheon Argent on a cross sable a wreath of laurel fructed Argent a chief checky Sable and Argent.

Government offices
Preceded by Sir Maurice Hankey	Cabinet Secretary; 1938–1946	Succeeded by Sir Norman Brook
Preceded by Sir Richard Hopkins	Head of the Home Civil Service; 1945–1956	Succeeded by Sir Norman Brook
Preceded by Sir Richard Hopkins	Permanent Secretary to the Treasury; 1945–1956	Succeeded by Sir Norman Brook; Sir Roger Makins
Peerage of the United Kingdom
New creation	Baron Bridges; 1957–1969	Succeeded by Thomas Bridges
Academic offices
Preceded by The Viscount Templewood	Chancellor of the University of Reading; 1959–1969	Succeeded by The Lord Sherfield
