= Mark Bridges, 3rd Baron Bridges =

British lawyer (born 1954)

Mark Thomas Bridges, 3rd Baron Bridges, KCVO (born 25 July 1954), is the solicitor to, among others, the Princess Royal, the Duchy of Lancaster, and formerly Queen Elizabeth II.

He is the son of Thomas Bridges, 2nd Baron Bridges. He was educated at Eton College, Berkshire, and at Corpus Christi College, Cambridge. He became the 3rd Baron Bridges on the death of his father in 2017.

He currently works for Farrer & Co, a solicitor's firm in London which was founded by his grandmother's great-grandfather. He is married to Angela Margaret Collinson and has four children of whom three living.

Bridges was appointed Commander of the Royal Victorian Order (CVO) in the 2012 New Year Honours for his work as personal solicitor to the Queen, being advanced Knight Commander of the Royal Victorian Order in the 2019 New Year Honours.

In 2022, Bridges was elected Prime Warden of the Worshipful Company of Goldsmiths.

An investigation revealed that Lord Bridges served as a trustee on at least five trusts holding assets in France and Spain on behalf of Rifaat al-Assad or his relatives between 1999 and 2008.

Peerage of the United Kingdom
Preceded by Thomas Bridges	Baron Bridges; 2017–present	Incumbent; Heir presumptive: Nicholas Bridges
