= Trevor Aston =

British historian (1925–1985)

- Born: Trevor Henry Aston; 14 June 1925; Fulham, England
- Died: 17 October 1985 (aged 60); Oxford, England
- Occupations: Historian and academic
- Spouse: Margaret Bridges (m. 1954; div. 1969)

Academic background
- Education: Midhurst Grammar School
- Alma mater: St John's College, Oxford

Academic work
- Discipline: History
- Sub-discipline: Middle Ages; Domesday Book; Manorialism
- Institutions: Corpus Christi College, Oxford
- Notable works: History of the University of Oxford

Trevor Henry Aston (14 June 1925 – 17 October 1985) was a British historian and academic at the University of Oxford. He was a tutor in history and fellow of Corpus Christi College, Oxford, from 1952 to 1985. In addition, he served as Keeper of the Archives of the University of Oxford from 1969 to 1985.

== Early life ==
Aston was born in Fulham, London, on 14 June 1925. His father, Oliver, had mental health problems and was unable to work regularly; his mother worked at a home for children orphaned through tuberculosis, in Woolbeding, Sussex, and Aston was brought up there. He studied at Midhurst Grammar School, living with the headmaster. After two terms at St John's College, Oxford, studying Philosophy, Politics and Economics, Aston joined the Royal Marines in 1943 but did not see combat. Back in Oxford in 1946, he switched to read Modern History and obtained a first-class degree in 1949.

== Academic career ==
Having graduated in 1949, he was elected as a junior research fellow (1950), then fellow and tutor in history (1952), of Corpus Christi College, Oxford, and took a particular interest in the history of the college. He served as college librarian from 1956 onwards. His research interests were primarily Domesday and the manorial economy, although he was often reluctant to publish. He was also (from 1968) the first director of research and general editor of the History of the University of Oxford, published in eight volumes (although only one volume appeared before his death), and was the university's Keeper of the Archives from 1969 onwards. He also edited the historical journal Past & Present from 1960 until his death. He enjoyed driving very fast between Oxford and his house in Fulham.

== Health and death ==
Aston suffered from manic depression and spent time in hospital. His behaviour, at times very difficult for colleagues to bear, led to problematic relations within the college and to a separation from his wife. He was found dead in his rooms in Corpus Christi on 17 October 1985 after a drug overdose. The then president of the college, Sir Kenneth Dover, admitted in his memoirs that he had been exasperated with the effects of Aston's illness and, having exhausted all other tactics, he knowingly pushed Aston into a pressured situation which might precipitate suicide.

== Personal life ==
In 1954, Aston married Margaret Bridges. She was a medieval historian who was a student at Oxford at the time of the marriage. Their relationship was difficult because of his bipolar disorder, and they separated after four years; they finally divorced in 1969. Though she remarried, she continued to use Aston as her surname in academic publications.
