= Thomas Farrer, 2nd Baron Farrer =

British Baron (1859–1940)

Personal details
- Born: 25 October 1859
- Died: 12 April 1940 (aged 80)
- Spouse: Evelyn Spring Rice (m. 1892) Evangeline Knox (m. 1903)
- Parent(s): Thomas Farrer, 1st Baron Farrer; Frances Erskine

Thomas Cecil Farrer, 2nd Baron Farrer (25 October 1859 – 12 April 1940), was the second Baron Farrer. He was the eldest son of Thomas Farrer, 1st Baron Farrer, and his first wife Frances Erskine.

== Life ==
Farrer was a long-term member of the board of the Underground Electric Railways Company of London (a forerunner of the London Underground).

He owned a mainly wooded smallholding with house, Abinger Hall in Abinger, Surrey, which was renamed at or before the early 1700s when bought by the Dowager Countess of Donegal. Its predecessor was demolished and rebuilt by Farrer's father and is a non-listed home around a courtyard of its former wings and other houses. In 1882 and 1886, on admission of his brothers to Trinity College, Cambridge University, the family also had their home at 27 Bryanston Square, London.

== Family ==
In 1892 Farrer married Evelyn Spring Rice, daughter of Hon. Charles Spring Rice, the son of Thomas Spring Rice, 1st Baron Monteagle of Brandon. They had one son (Cecil Claude Farrer, born 1893) and two daughters (Frances Margaret Farrer (born 1895) and Katharine Dianthe Farrer (born 1896) who married Edward Bridges, 1st Baron Bridges). In 1903 he remarried to Evangeline Knox, daughter of Octavius Knox. They had one son (Oliver Thomas Farrer) and one daughter (Anne Lucy Farrer, b. 1908).

Peerage of the United Kingdom
Preceded by Thomas Farrer	Baron Farrer; 1899–1940	Succeeded by Cecil Farrer
