= List of ambassadors of the United Kingdom to Italy =

The ambassador of the United Kingdom to Italy is the United Kingdom's foremost diplomatic representative in the Italian Republic, and head of the UK's diplomatic mission in Italy. The official title is His Britannic Majesty's Ambassador to the Italian Republic (until 1946, the Kingdom of Italy). The first British mission to the united Italy was a legation located in Turin, taking over the mission to the Kingdom of Sardinia when Victor Emmanuel II changed his title from "King of Sardinia" in "King of Italy" (see also list of diplomats of the United Kingdom to Sardinia); it moved to Florence in 1865 and to Rome in 1871. The mission was upgraded to a full embassy in 1876.

The office incorporates that of ambassador of the United Kingdom to the Most Serene Republic of San Marino.

== Heads of mission ==
=== Envoys extraordinary and ministers plenipotentiary ===
- 1861–1863: Sir James Hudson
- 1863–1867: Henry Elliot
- 1867–1876: Sir Augustus Paget

=== Ambassadors ===
- 1876–1883: Sir Augustus Paget
- 1883–1888: Sir John Savile
- 1888–1892: The Marquess of Dufferin and Ava
- 1892–1893: The Lord Vivian
- 1893–1898: Sir Clare Ford
- 1898–1903: The Lord Currie
- 1903–1904: Sir Francis Bertie
- 1905–1908: Sir Edwin Egerton
- 1908–1919: Sir Rennell Rodd
- 1919–1921: Sir George Buchanan
- 1921–1933: Sir Ronald Graham
- 1933–1939: The Earl of Perth
- 1939–1940: Sir Percy Loraine

No representation 1940–1944 due to World War II

- 1944–1947: Sir Noel Charles
- 1947–1953: Sir Victor Mallet
- 1953–1962: Sir Ashley Clarke
- 1962–1966: Sir John Ward
- 1966–1969: Sir Evelyn Shuckburgh
- 1969–1974: Sir Patrick Hancock
- 1974–1976: Sir Guy Millard
- 1976–1979: Sir Alan Campbell
- 1979–1983: Sir Ronald Arculus
- 1983–1987: The Lord Bridges
- 1987–1989: Sir Derek Thomas
- 1989–1992: Sir Stephen Egerton
- 1992–1996: Sir Patrick Fairweather
- 1996–2000: Sir Thomas Richardson
- 2000–2003: Sir John Shepherd
- 2003–2006: Sir Ivor Roberts
- 2006–2011: Edward Chaplin
- 2011–2016: Christopher Prentice
- 2016–2022: Jill Morris
- 2022-2026: The Lord Llewellyn of Steep
- 2026–present: Stephen Hickey
