= Ronald Arculus =

British ambassador and businessman (1923–2016)

Sir Ronald Arculus KCMG KCVO (11 February 1923 – 28 August 2016) was a British ambassador and businessman.

== Career ==
Ronald Arculus was educated at Solihull School and Exeter College, Oxford. He served in the 4th Queen's Own Hussars 1942–45, then joined the Diplomatic Service in 1947. Besides postings at the Foreign Office (later the Foreign and Commonwealth Office) he served in British missions at San Francisco, La Paz, Ankara and Washington, D.C., as deputy Consul-General at New York, and as Minister (Economic) at the embassy in Paris. He led the UK delegation to the United Nations Conference on the Law of the Sea (UNCLOS III), with the rank of ambassador, at New York 1977–79. He was ambassador to Italy 1979–83, his last diplomatic post before retirement.

After leaving the Diplomatic Service, Arculus was a non-executive director of Glaxo 1983–91 and continued as a consultant 1992–95. During the preparation for the Channel Tunnel project Arculus was appointed by the Secretary of State for Transport to be a special adviser on the through trains planned to run via the tunnel to Paris, Brussels and elsewhere. He was also a governor of the British Institute of Florence 1983–94. He was a Fellow of the Chartered Management Institute.

== Honours ==
Arculus was appointed CMG in 1968 and knighted KCMG in 1979 on his appointment to the embassy at Rome. He was given the additional knighthood of KCVO following the Queen's state visit to Italy in October 1980. The Italian government made him a Knight Grand Cross of the Order of Merit. He was a Freeman of the City of London and an honorary Fellow of his alma mater, Exeter College, Oxford.

== References and sources ==
Sources

- ARCULUS, Sir Ronald, Who's Who 2016, A & C Black, 2016 (online edition, Oxford University Press, 2015)
