= Italy–United Kingdom relations =

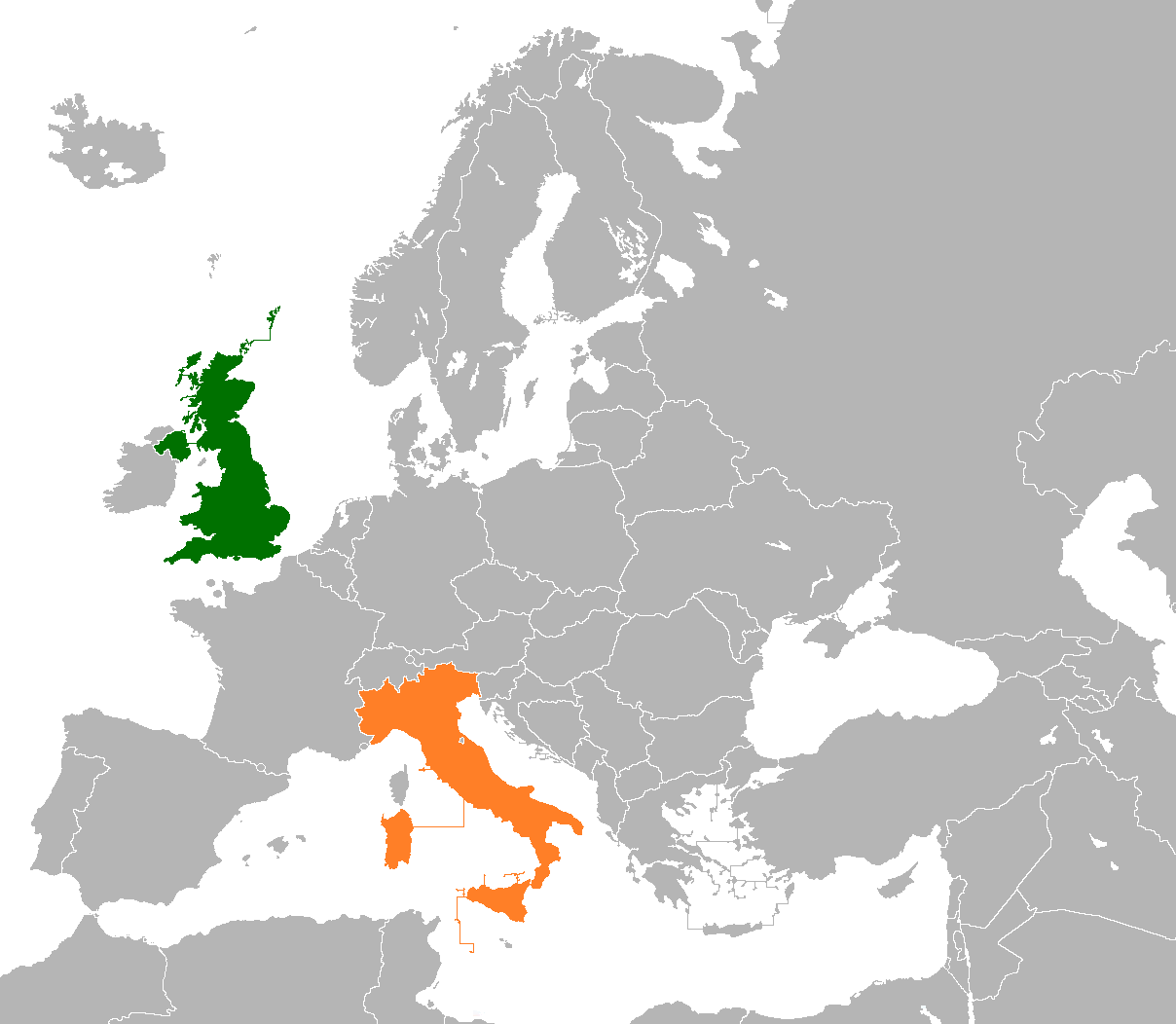

- United Kingdom: Italy

Diplomatic mission
- Embassy of the United Kingdom, Rome: Embassy of Italy, London

Envoy
- Ambassador Edward Llewellyn: Ambassador Inigo Lambertini

The bilateral relations between the Italian Republic and the United Kingdom of Great Britain and Northern Ireland "are warm and exceptionally strong." Both nations are members of the United Nations, NATO, Council of Europe, Organisation for Economic Co-operation and Development, Organization for Security and Co-operation in Europe, G7 and G20 major economies, World Trade Organization, among others.

The Italian ambassador to the United Kingdom is Inigo Lambertini since 6 October 2022, and the British ambassador to Italy is Edward Llewellyn since February 2022.

== History ==
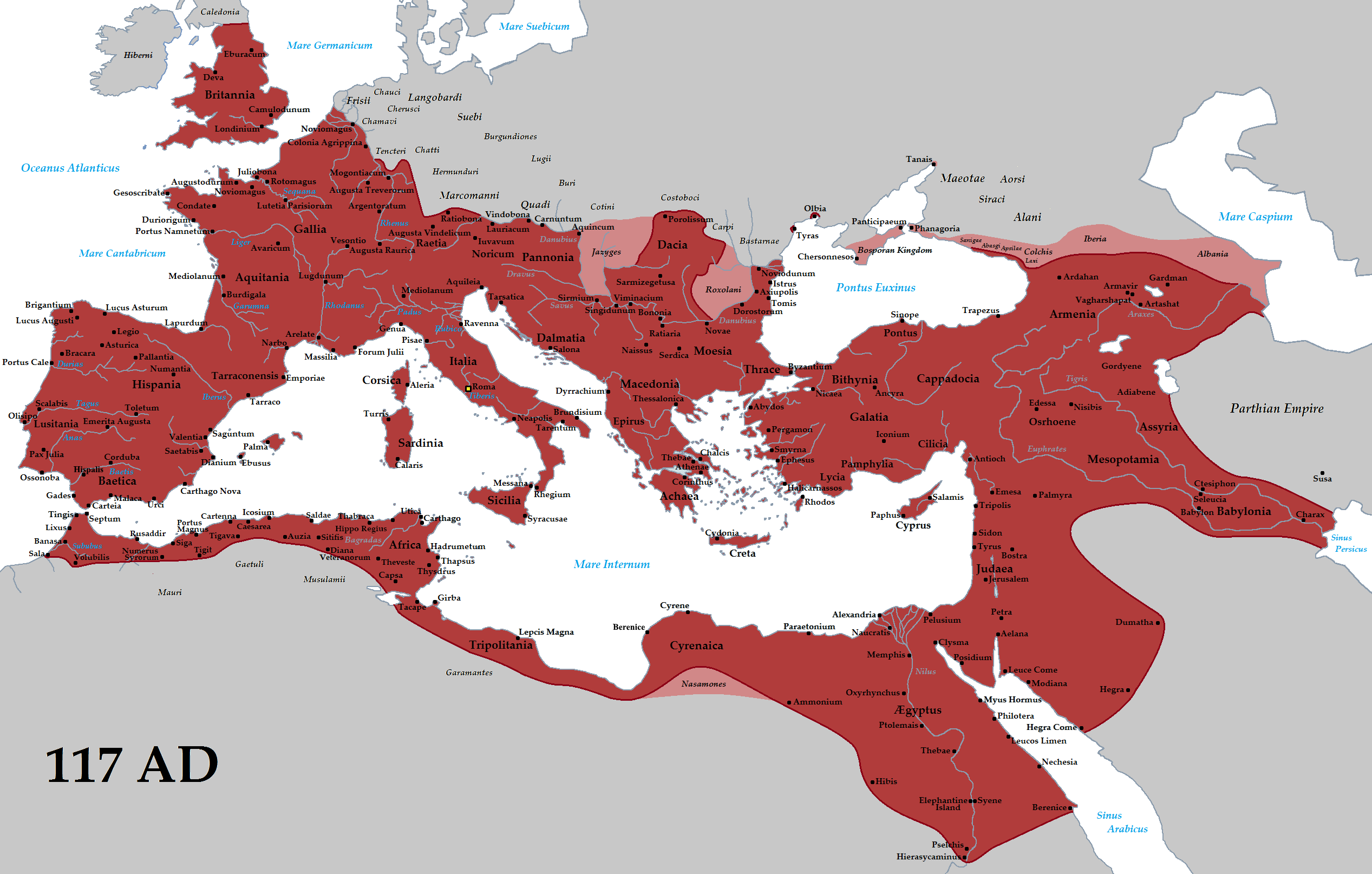
Most of Britain's territory came under the Roman Empire

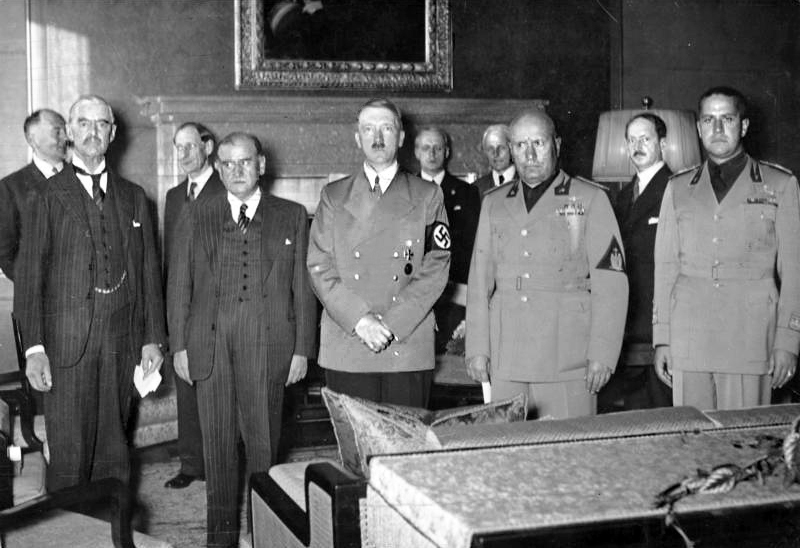
From left to right, Chamberlain, Daladier, Hitler, Mussolini and Italian Foreign Minister Count Ciano as they prepare to sign the Munich Agreement.

Diplomatic relations between Britain and Italy predate both Britain and Italy's unification, with diplomatic exchanges between the Papal States and England growing particularly heated during the investiture disputes between kings William and John and their respective archbishops of Canterbury Anselm and Langton. The latter feud ended with John's excommunication being lifted in exchange for swearing his fealty to the papacy.

Later, the Court of St. James hosted ambassadors from various states of the Italian peninsula, including those of the Kingdom of Sicily and Piedmont-Sardinia's Count Perron. The British government gave moral and diplomatic support to the "Risorgimento" (Unification of Italy) and the creation of the modern Italian state against considerable international opposition. The famed hero of unification, Giuseppe Garibaldi was widely celebrated in Britain, with a peak in 1861.

In late 19th century, the Second Mediterranean Agreement represented a mechanism for Britain, Austria-Hungary, and Italy to coordinate on Eastern Mediterranean security. Count Gołuchowski, representing Austrian interests, attempted to strengthen and modernize this framework in cooperation attempts to renew or revise the pact, while Lord Salisbury exemplified British caution, ensuring that commitments did not overextend British obligations.

=== 20th century ===
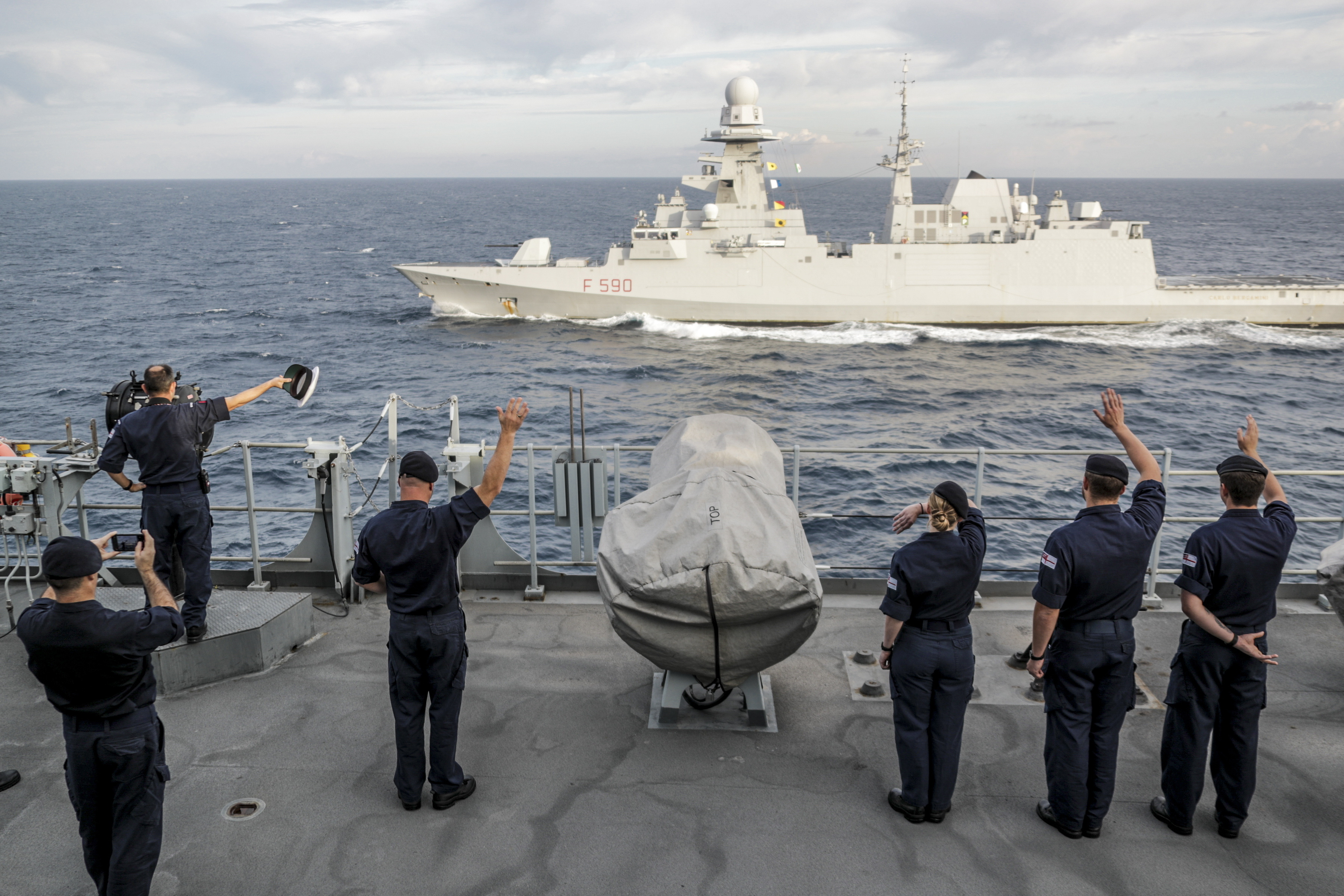
Crew of HMS Albion wave to Italian frigate Carlo Bergamini during exercise in 2020

Italy and Britain concluded the London Pact and entered a formal alliance on 26 April 1915. Following this, Britain, Italy, and the rest of the Allied Nations won the First World War. During that war, British intelligence subsidized Benito Mussolini's activism. Following the march on Rome, Italy initially maintained their close ties with Great Britain. Both countries stood opposed to the French occupation of the Ruhr, and found common ground on the formation of the Four-Power Pact. However, it became clear that Mussolini's expansionist ambitions began to run opposed to Britain's desire to uphold the status quo in the Mediterranean.

The initial Corfu incident did little to endear Italo-British relations. Italy occupied the Greek island of Corfu following a disputed killing of Italian arbitrators on the mission to more clearly define the Greco-Albanian border. The conference of Ambassadors that followed was seen as Mussolini's first diplomatic victory, where Italy was granted concessions from Greece, including paving the way for the secession of Jubaland from Britain in modern-day Somalia.

Relations finally broke down following the Italian invasion of Abyssinia. Under the guidelines of the League of Nations, Great Britain implemented economic sanctions against Italy, which would cause a lasting rift in their relationship. Although attempts were made to accommodate Italy's ambitions with the Hoare-Laval Pact, which would accept the expansion of Italian Eritrea's sphere of influence over all of Abyssinia (modern Ethiopia). However, the treaty's unpopularity forced Hoare's resignation, and future British governments showed more opposition. The subsequent lack of recognition of Italian East Africa from Great Britain made it apparent that Italy would need to seek approval elsewhere.

With Italy and Germany increasingly facilitating cooperation, Britain made an attempt to prevent Italy from further drifting into Germany's sphere of influence. On April 16, 1938, Italy and Britain signed the Easter Accords, which helped to obtain consensus over the status quo in the Arabian peninsula, uphold freedom of navigation in the Suez, and to preserve the peace between their colonial possessions in East Africa. Ethiopia was conveniently not named in the agreements. This ultimately proved to be insufficient in reattaining the previously friendly attitude between the two Empires.

Owing to Mussolini's Axis Pact between his Italy and Hitler's Germany, in 1940 Italy joined the Second World War on the side of Germany. Britain and Italy were thus at war through the early 1940s, until the Allied invasion of Sicily ended with Italy's defeat in 1943. The Italian government overthrew Mussolini in 1943 and signed an armistice with the Allies. Germany meanwhile invaded the northern half of Italy, released Mussolini, and set up the Italian Social Republic, a puppet regime that helped Germany fight against the Allies until it collapsed in spring 1945.

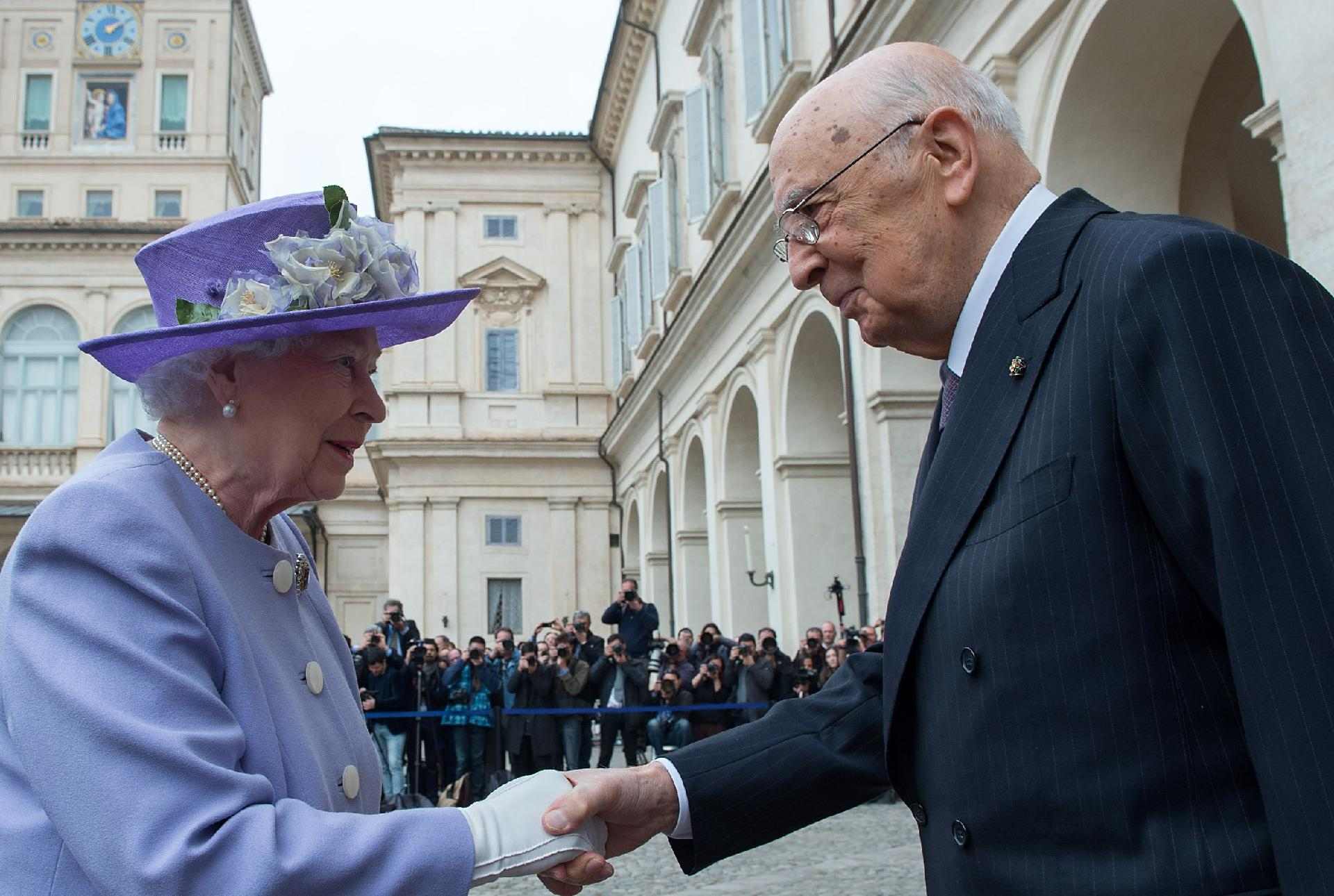
Queen Elizabeth II with President Giorgio Napolitano during her state visit to Italy 2014

The United Kingdom and Italy now enjoy a warm and friendly relationship. Queen Elizabeth II made four state visits to the Italian Republic during her reign, in 1961, 1980, 2000, and April 2014, when she was received by President Giorgio Napolitano. King Charles III made a state visit to Italy in April 2025, where he was officially welcomed by President Sergio Mattarella and met with Prime Minister Giorgia Meloni.

The former Prime Minister of the United Kingdom, Rishi Sunak, had a good relationship with his Italian counterpart, Giorgia Meloni. They met several times, both in London and Rome, and at international summits. Prime Minister Sunak attended the right-wing political festival "Atreju" hosted by Meloni.

== Cultural relations ==
Between 4 and 5 million British tourists visit Italy every year, while 1 million Italian tourists visit the UK. There are about 30,000 British nationals living in Italy, and 342,000 Italians living in the UK. In 2011, 7,100 Italian students were studying in UK universities, this is the seventh-highest figure amongst EU countries and fifteenth globally.

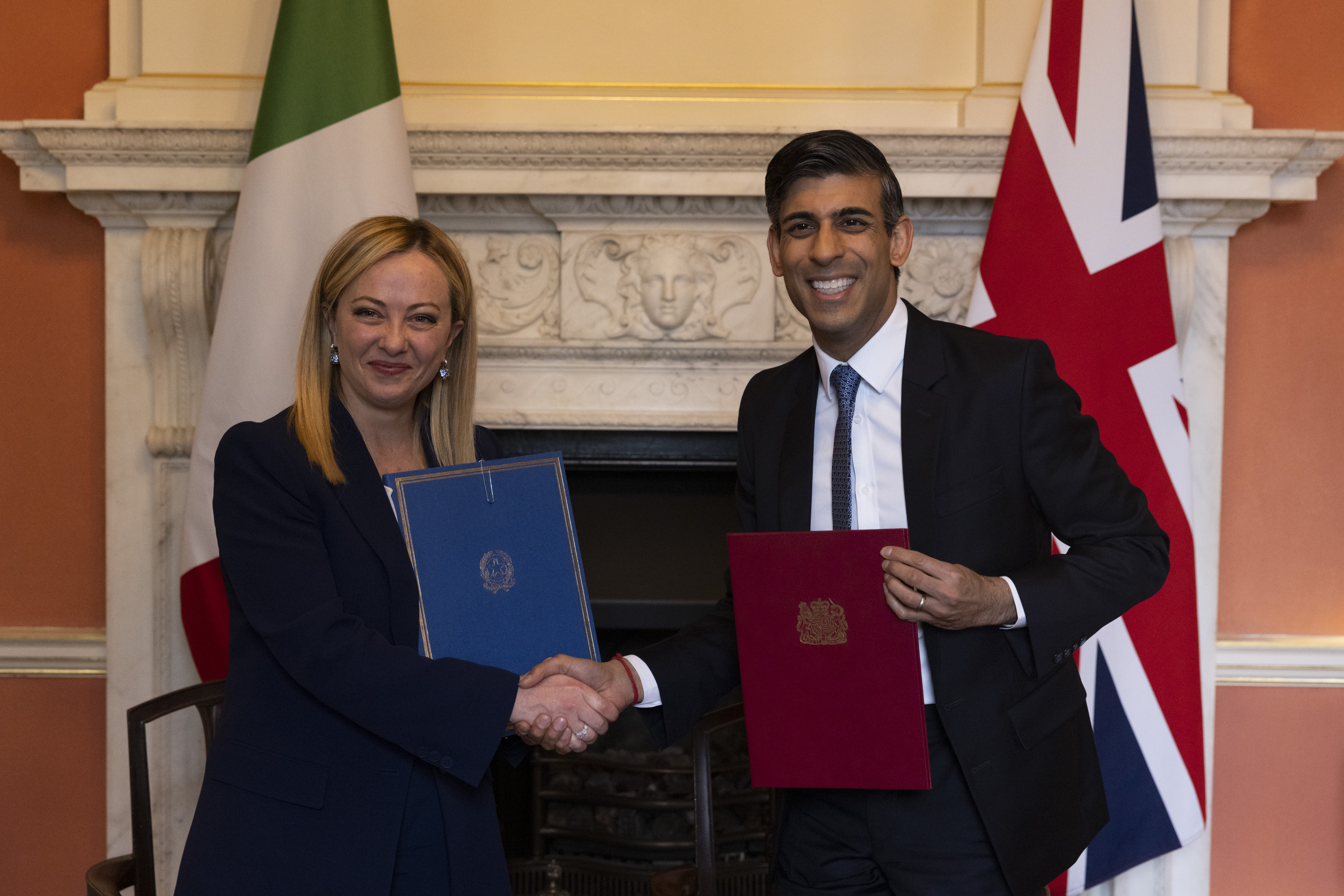
United Kingdom Prime Minister Rishi Sunak and Italian Prime Minister Giorgia Meloni, at a meeting in London in 2023.

Association football, in its modern form, was said to have been introduced to Italy by British expatriates during the 1880s. Genoa Cricket and Football Club, founded by Englishmen in 1893, was allegedly formed as a cricket club to represent England abroad. Three years later in 1896 a man named James Richardson Spensley arrived in Genoa introducing the football section of the club and becoming its first manager. Other evidence suggests that Edoardo Bosio, a merchant worker in the British textile industry had visited the United Kingdom and decided to introduce the sport in his homeland. He returned to Turin in 1887 and founded Torino Football and Cricket Club. One of the most important football clubs in Italy, AC Milan, was founded in 1899 by an Englishman from Nottingham, Herbert Kilpin. As a consequence, it kept the English version of the city's name in its own name, Milan, rather than the Italian Milano.

== Economic relations ==
Following Brexit, trade between the United Kingdom and Italy is governed by the EU–UK Trade and Cooperation Agreement since 1 January 2021.

== Resident diplomatic missions ==
- Italy has an embassy in London, a consulate-general in Edinburgh and a consulate in Manchester.
- The United Kingdom has an embassy in Rome, and a consulate-general in Milan.
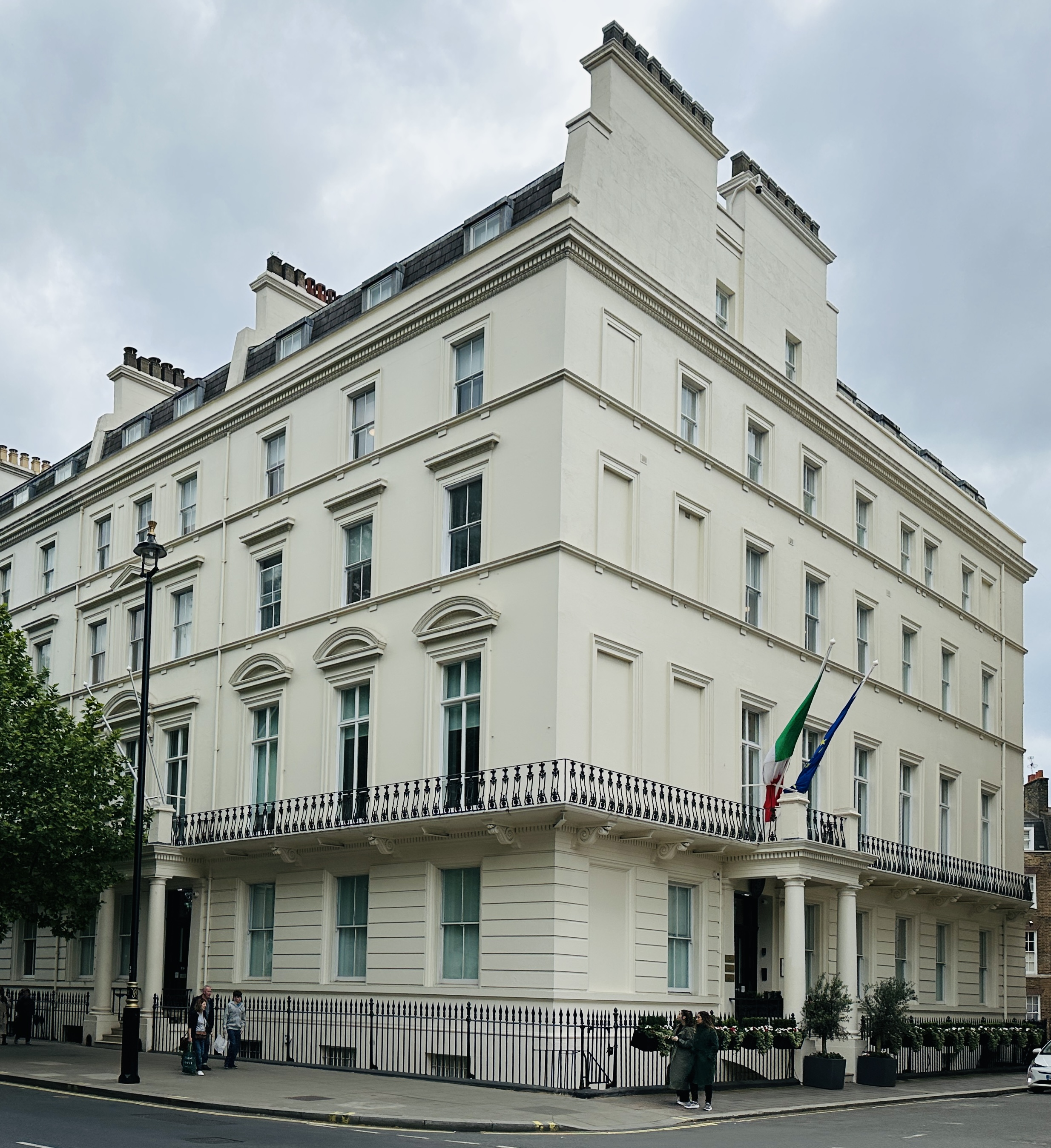
Embassy of Italy in London

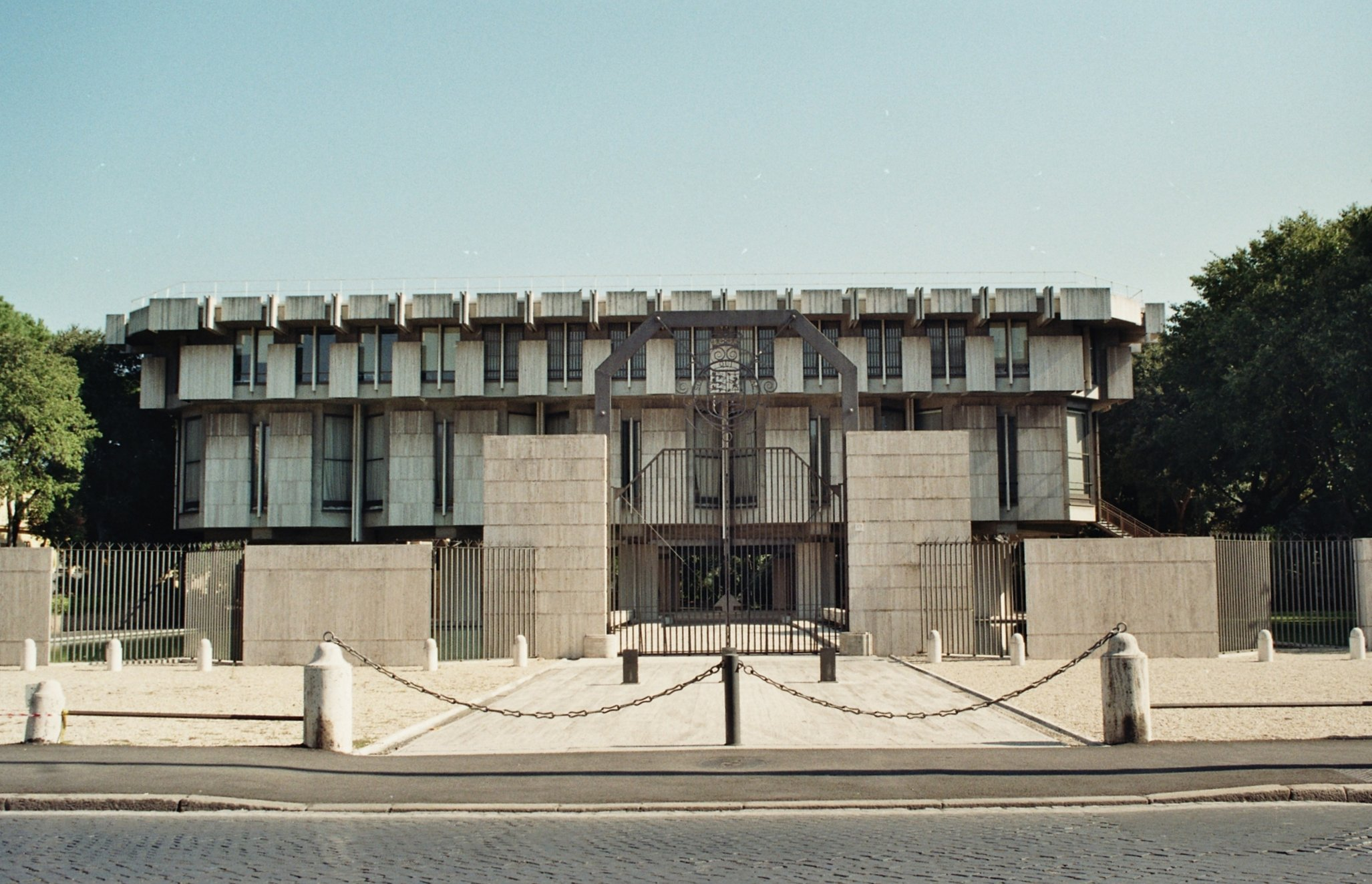
Embassy of the United Kingdom in Rome

== See also ==
- List of Ambassadors from the United Kingdom to Italy
- Foreign relations of the United Kingdom
- Foreign relations of Italy
- Italians in the United Kingdom
- Holy See–United Kingdom Relations (including its history as the Papal States)
- European Union–United Kingdom relations
- 1946 British Embassy bombing
