= Embassy of the United Kingdom, Rome =

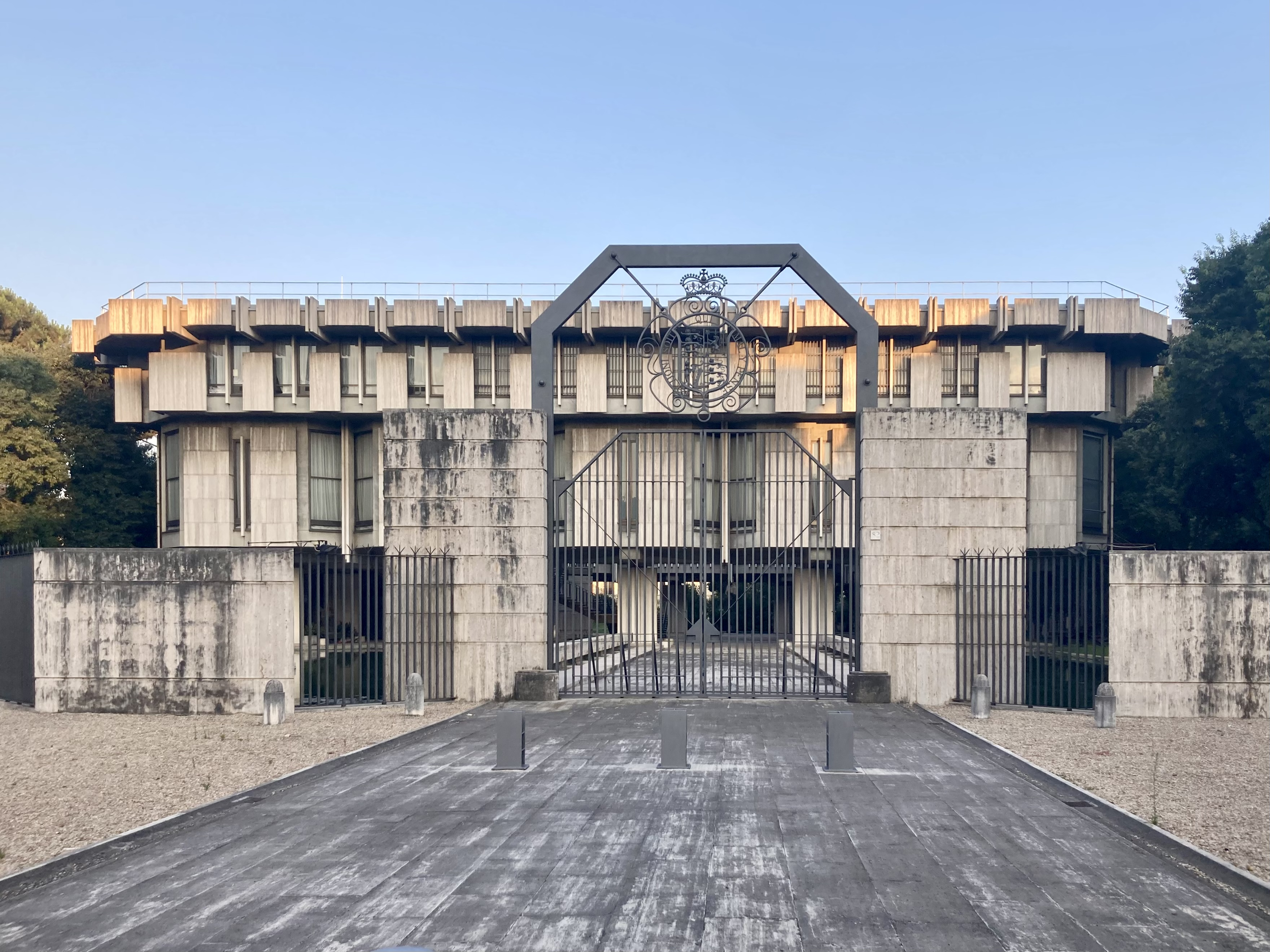
- The Embassy building in Rome
- Location: (Italy) Municipio I, Rome
- Address: Via XX Settembre 80/a, 00187 Rome, Italy
- Coordinates: 41°54′30″N 12°30′05″E
- Ambassador: Edward Llewellyn (to Italy); Christopher Trott (to Holy See)

The Embassy of the United Kingdom in Rome is the chief diplomatic mission of the United Kingdom in Italy and San Marino. It is located on Via XX Settembre in Municipio I. The current British Ambassador to Italy is Edward Llewellyn. The British Embassy to the Holy See is located in a separate building within the same compound.

== History ==
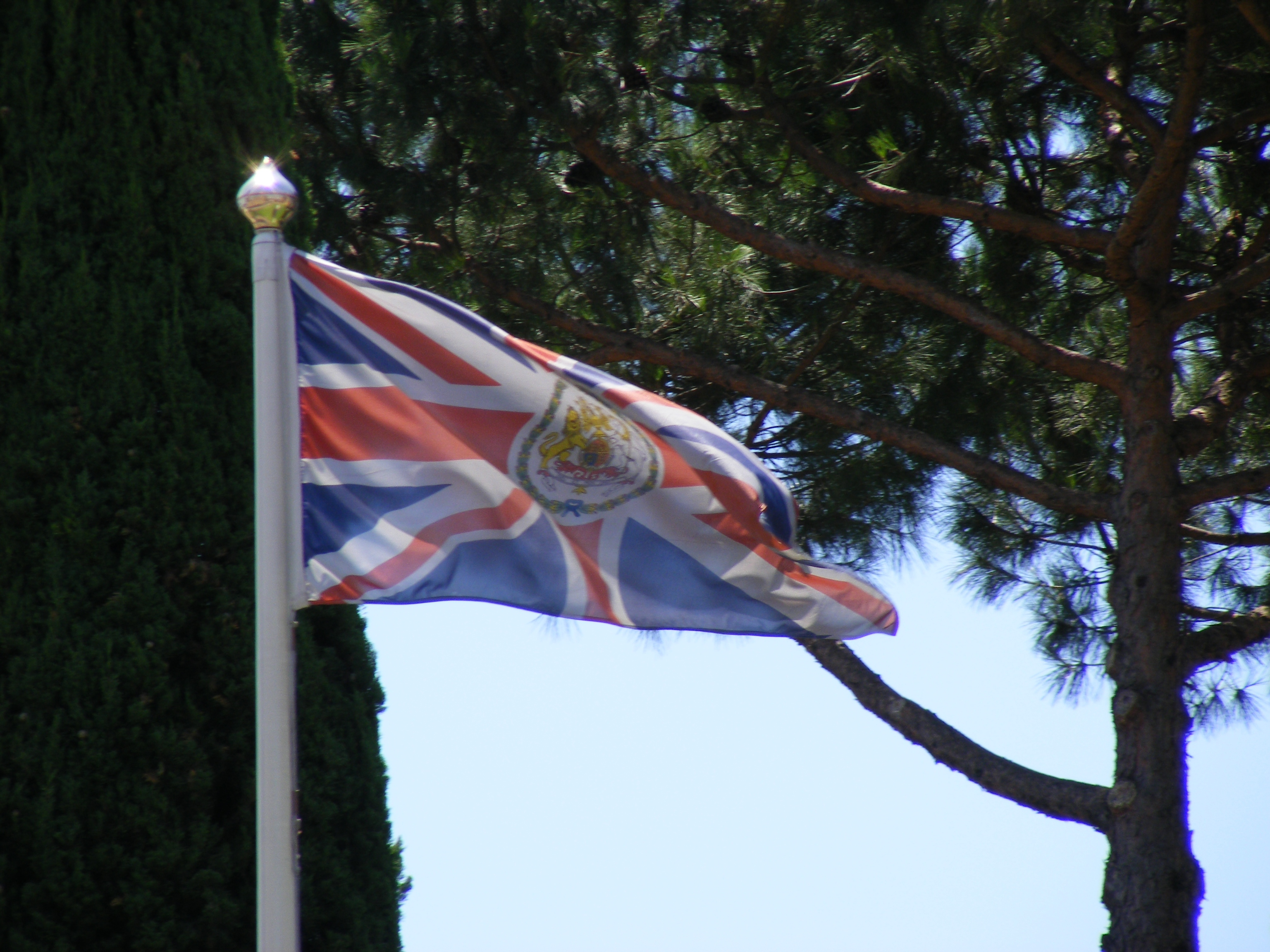
British diplomatic flag flying above the Embassy

The embassy building at Rome's Porta Pia was designed by the British architect Sir Basil Spence, and opened in 1971. It replaced a building on the same location bought by the British government in the 19th century, which had been severely damaged in a Zionist terrorist attack in 1946.

The former Porta Nomentana in the Aurelian Walls of Rome, blocked by Pope Pius IV in 1564, serves as a boundary wall for the British Embassy.

The Ambassador's residence, in the San Giovanni area of Rome, was originally the property of an expatriate Russian princess, Zinaida Volkonskaya. It was made available to the British government by the Italian government after the bombing of the building at Porta Pia, and the offices were located there while the new embassy was being planned and built. It was formally purchased by Britain in 1951.

Outside Rome, there is also a British Consulate-General in Milan, where the senior officer is known as the Consul-General. The embassy also represents the British Overseas Territories in Italy.

== See also ==
- Italy–United Kingdom relations
- List of diplomatic missions in Italy
- List of Ambassadors of the United Kingdom to Italy
- List of Brutalist structures
