= Charles baronets =

Extinct baronetcy in the Baronetage of the United Kingdom

The Charles Baronetcy, of The Abbey Grange, Waltham Abbey, in the County of Essex and of Manchester Square in the Parish of St Marylebone in the County of London, was a title in the Baronetage of the United Kingdom. It was created on 20 March 1928 for Sir Havelock Charles, Honorary Serjeant Surgeon to His Majesty George V. The third Baronet was British Ambassador to Italy from 1944 to 1947. The title became extinct on his death in 1975.

== Charles baronets, of The Abbey Grange and Manchester Square (1928) ==
- Sir (Richard Henry) Havelock Charles, 1st Baronet (1858–1934)
- Sir Allen Aitchison Havelock Charles, 2nd Baronet 1887–1936)
- Sir Noel Hughes Havelock Charles, 3rd Baronet (1891–1975)
