= Embassy of Italy, London =

Diplomatic mission of Italy in the United Kingdom, located in London

Embassy of Italy in London
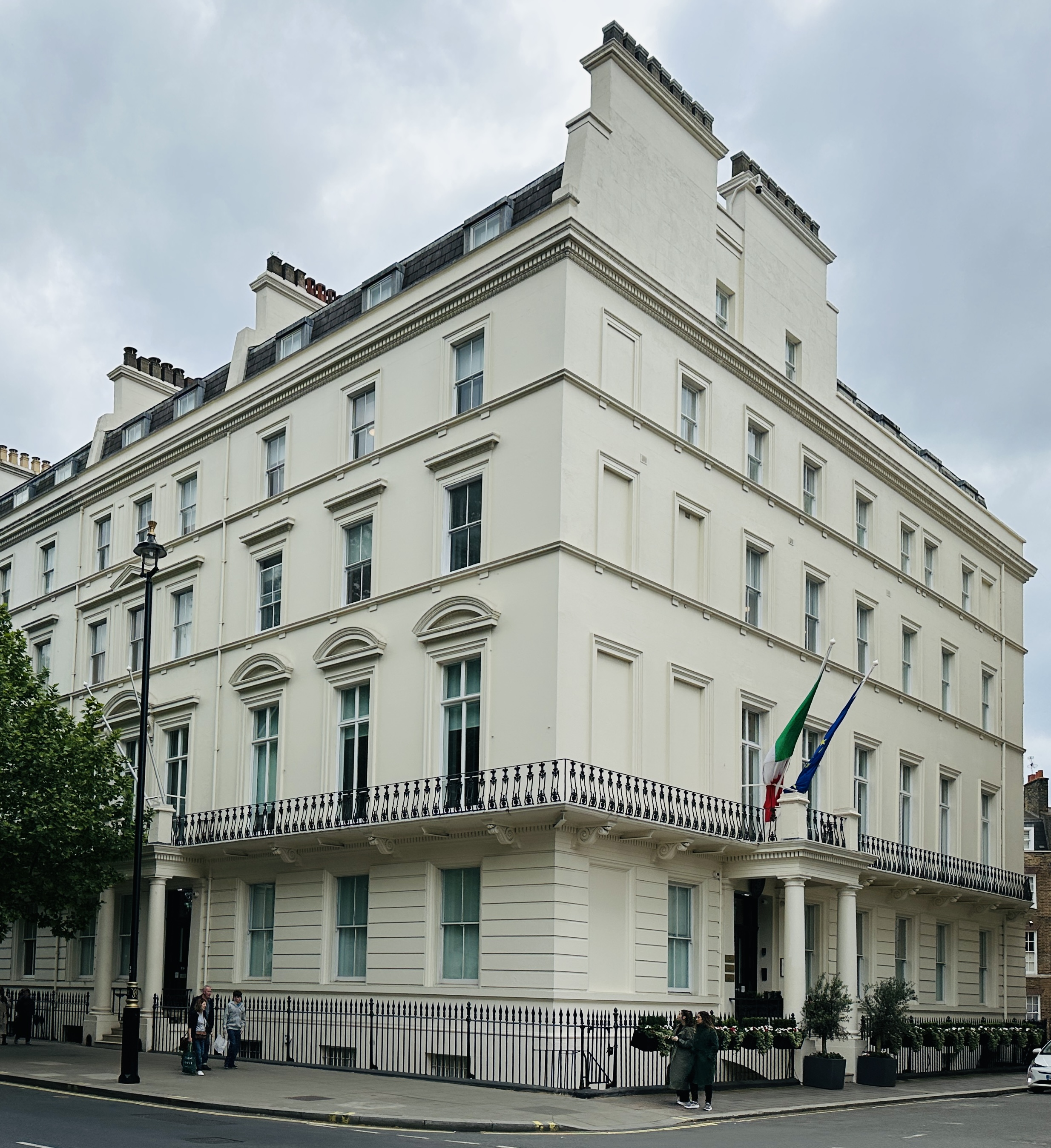
- Location: Mayfair, London
- Address: 4-5 Buckingham Gate, London, SW1E 6JP
- Coordinates: 51°30′42.2″N 0°8′59.6″W
- Ambassador: H.E. Inigo Lambertini

The Embassy of Italy in London is the diplomatic mission of Italy in the United Kingdom, located at 4-5 Buckingham Gate, City of Westminster. The ambassadorial residence is located at 4 Grosvenor Square, Mayfair.

== History ==
It is believed the chancery was built between 1850–1855 by James Pennethorne. It is Grade II listed and also houses the Italian Cultural Institute and Italian Trade Agency. The building was purchased by the Italian government in 2025 for £45 million.

The ambassadorial residence was built about 1728 as part of the development of Grosvenor Square by the Grosvenor family. However, it was not until 10 years later that the lease, the most expensive in the Square, was purchased. The first leaseholder was Francis Howard, 1st Earl of Effingham: he rented the house to Edward Howard, 9th Duke of Norfolk, who lived in it until 1741. In February 1742 Lord Effingham sold the lease for £5,500 to Thomas Watson-Wentworth, 1st Marquess of Rockingham.

Learning in 1865 that the Grosvenor estate required the house to be rebuilt, the tenant Earl Fitzwilliam vacated the property, which was taken over by the architect, Sir Charles James Freake. Unable to find a new occupant for the renovated house, Freake passed the lease back to the Fitzwilliam family in 1872. They remained in occupation until the seventh Earl surrendered his lease in 1931.

In 1931, Italy was granted a lease for 200 years by Hugh Grosvenor, 2nd Duke of Westminster, for £35,000 and £350 per annum. Lord Gerald Wellesley was commissioned to convert the interior into suitable accommodation for the embassy, with marble fittings to suit the Italian art and furnishings. The Embassy had previously occupied 19/20 Grosvenor Square since 1887: that building was demolished in 1933.

Former locations were 35 Queen's Gate, South Kensington, and 20 Grosvenor Square.

== Gallery ==
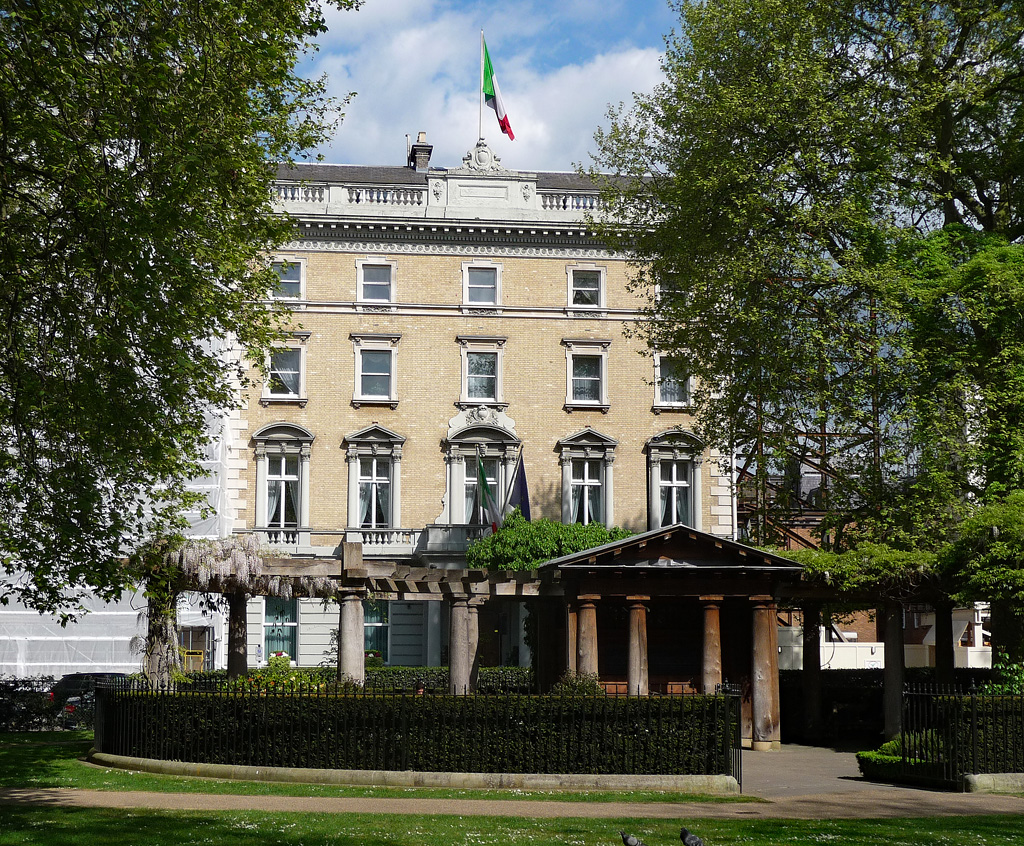
View of the ambassadorial residence from Grosvenor Square

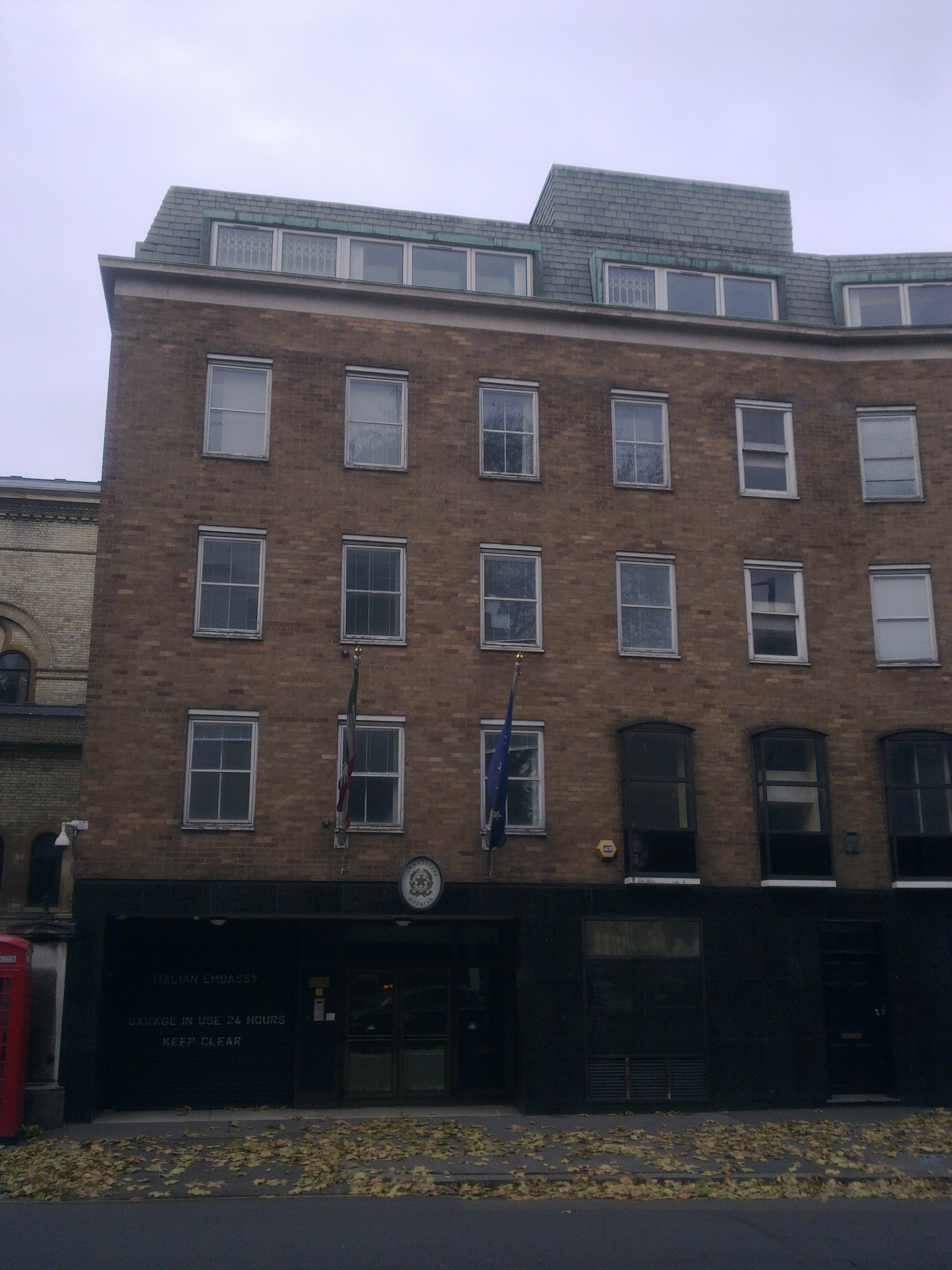
The Defence Section on Hobart Place

The Consular Section on Farringdon Road

== See also ==
- Italy–United Kingdom relations

== Bibliography ==
- Stourton, James (2012). Great Houses of London. London: Frances Lincoln. ISBN 978-0-7112-3366-9.
- Luigi Amaduzzi (2003). The Italian Embassy in London (PDF). Roma: Stabilimenti Tipografici Carlo Colombo. As described in Stefano Baldi. "Libri fotografici sulle Rappresentanze diplomatiche italiane all'estero".
