= Noel Charles =

British diplomat

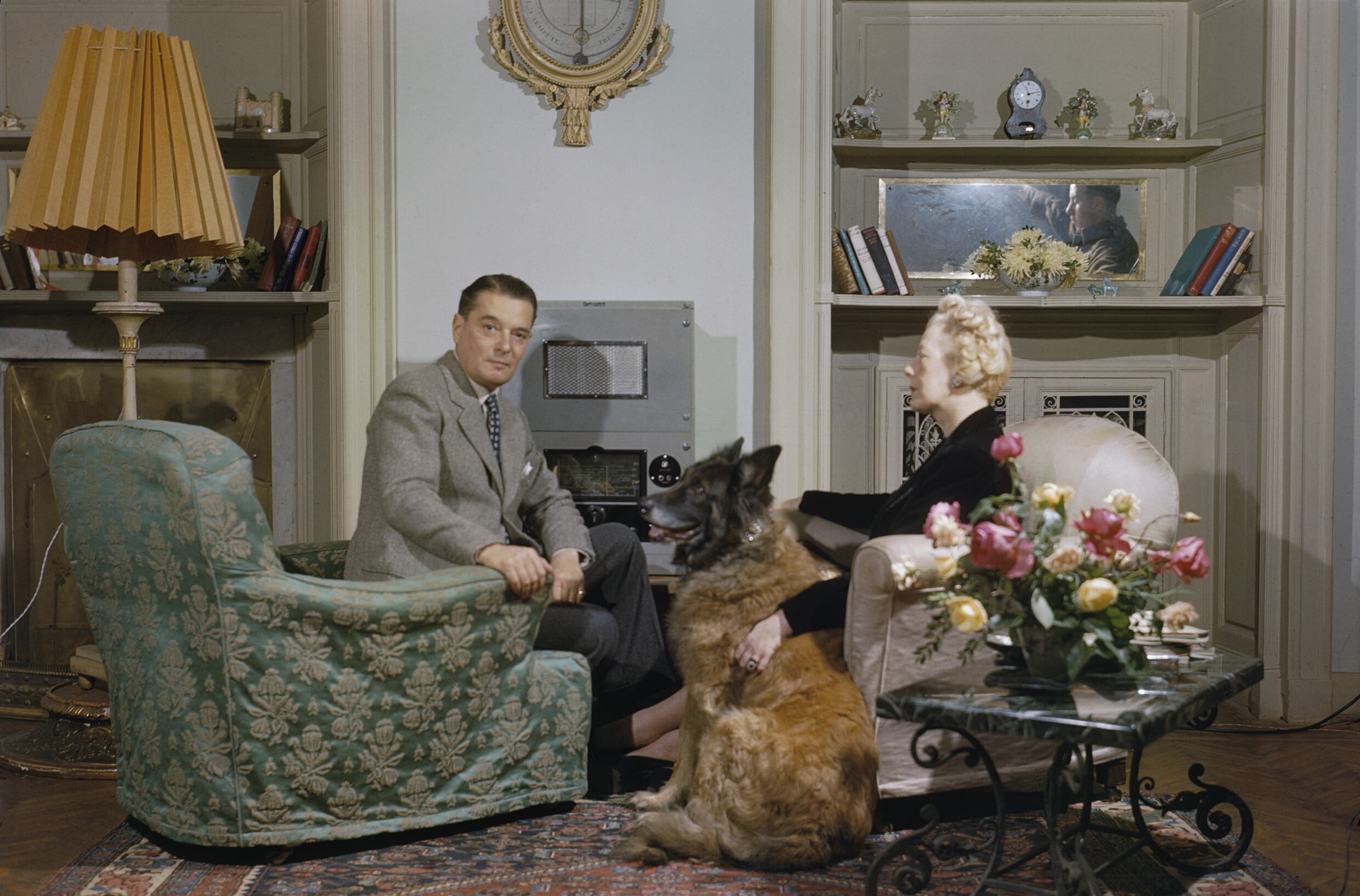
Noel Charles and his wife Lady Charles, listen to the news on the radio at the British Embassy in Rome in 1944

Sir Noel Hughes Havelock Charles, 3rd Baronet, KCMG, MC (20 November 1891 – 8 September 1975) was a British diplomat.

== Biography ==
Charles was the younger son of Sir Havelock Charles, 1st Baronet, Serjeant Surgeon to King George V. Educated at Rugby School and Christ Church, Oxford, he served in the First World War in France, receiving the Military Cross and two mentions in despatches.

He entered the Foreign Service as a Third Secretary at Brussels in 1919. He was posted to the Foreign Office in London 1921, to Bucharest in 1923, Tokyo in 1927, London in 1929, Stockholm in 1932, Moscow in 1933, Brussels in 1936, Rome in 1937, and Lisbon in 1940.

Charles was appointed British Ambassador to Brazil in 1941. In 1944, he was sent to Rome as British High Commissioner in Italy (subsequently Representative of HM Government to the Italian Government, with personal rank of Ambassador), serving there until 1947. While in Rome, he sent a memo to the British government suggesting that they urge Italy to set up a system of issuing exit permits to prevent Italy being used as a pathway for Jews seeking to reach Israel. Noel's Rome home was extensively damaged during a 1946 bombing by Irgun terrorists; he and his wife were away that day. After serving in London from 1947 to 1949, he retired in 1951.

Sir Noel was appointed a Companion of the Order of St Michael and St George (CMG) in 1937 and was promoted to Knight Commander (KCMG) in 1941.

Charles died in September 1975, aged 83, at which time the baronetcy became extinct.

== Sources ==
- Gilbert, Martin. Israel: A History. (New York: William Morrow and Company, Inc., 1998) p. 124
- Gat, Moshe. Britain and Italy: 1943-1949, The Decline of British Influence. (Brighton, United Kingdom: Sussex Academic Press, 1996) p. 131.

Baronetage of the United Kingdom
| Preceded by Allen Charles | Baronet (of The Abbey Grange and Manchester Square); 1936–1975 | Extinct |
Diplomatic posts
| Preceded by No representation due to War | British Ambassador to Italy; 1944–1947 | Succeeded by Victor Mallet |
| Preceded by Geoffrey Knox | British Ambassador to Brazil; 1941–1944 | Succeeded by Donald Gainer |
| Preceded by David Kelly | British Ambassador to Turkey; 1949–1951 | Succeeded by Alexander Knox Helm |
