= Havelock Charles =

Northern Irish surgeon and army officer (1858–1934)

Sir Havelock Charles GCVO KCSI
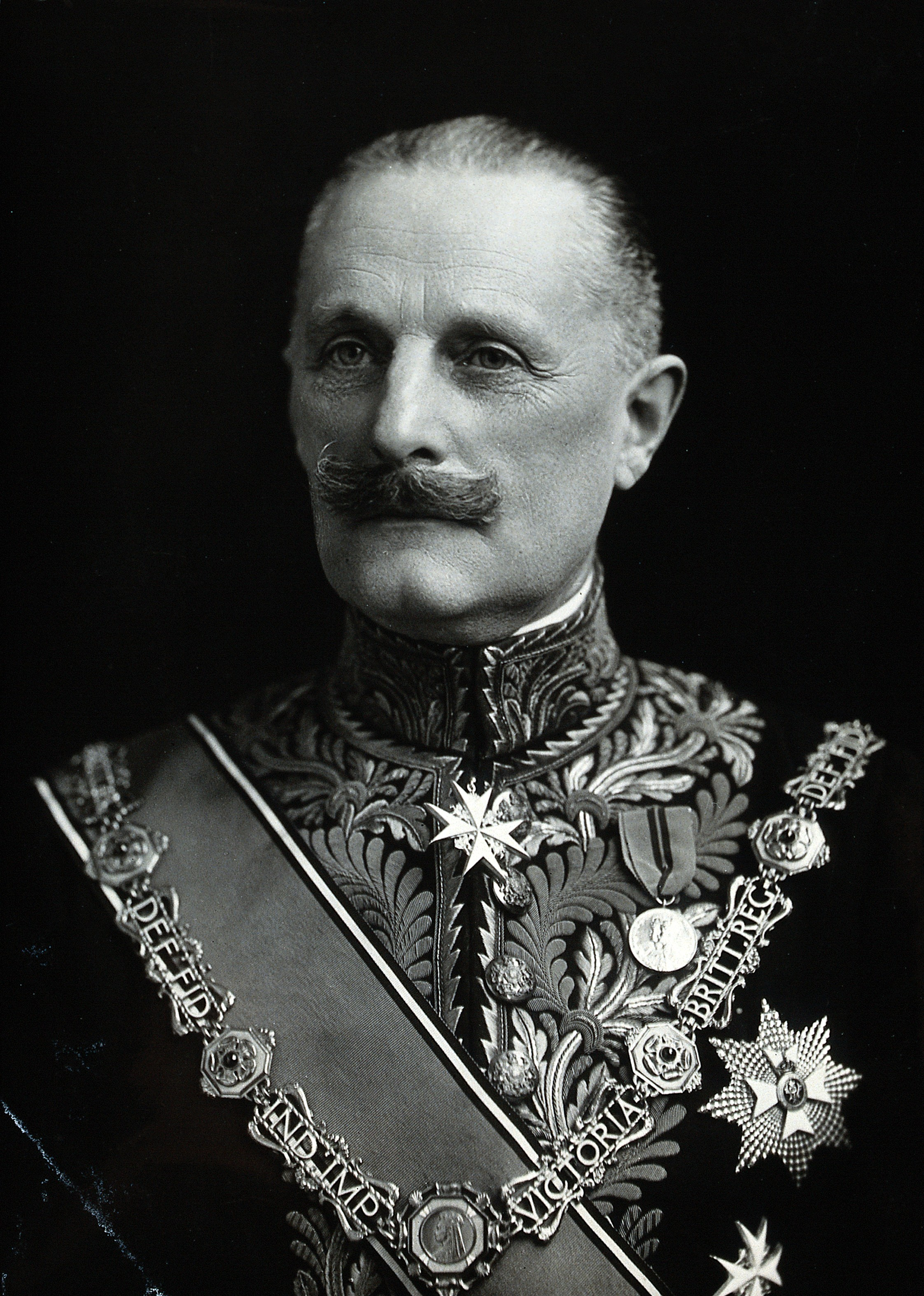
- Sir Havelock Charles in the 1920s
- Born: 10 March 1858
- Died: 27 October 1934 (aged 76)
- Military career
- Allegiance: United Kingdom
- Branch: Indian Medical Service
- Rank: Major-General
- Awards: Knight Grand Cross of the Royal Victorian Order; Knight Commander of the Order of the Star of India

Major-General Sir Richard Henry Havelock Charles, 1st Baronet, GCVO, KCSI (10 March 1858 – 27 October 1934) was a British medical doctor, and Serjeant Surgeon to King George V.

== Early life and medical career ==
Charles was born in Cookstown, County Tyrone, the sixth son of David Hughes Charles MD and Annie Elizabeth Allen, and named after Sir Henry Havelock, who had died two months earlier. He was educated at Queen's College, Cork, before joining the Indian Medical Service as a surgeon in April 1882. In the year 1894, he was appointed as a Professor of Anatomy at the Medical College, Calcutta, and surgeon at the College Hospital. On 1 April 1902 he was promoted to lieutenant-colonel, and later attained the rank of major-general. During his tenure as a surgeon in the Medical College, Calcutta, he also served as the staff surgeon to the Prince of Wales (later George V during the latter's tour of India. Following this, Charles was appointed a Knight Commander of the Royal Victorian Order (KCVO) in 1906, promoted to Knight Grand Cross (GCVO) in 1912 and was appointed a Knight Commander of the Order of the Star of India (KCSI) in 1923.

== Court appointment ==
On his return to India and upon ascension of George V to the throne, Charles was appointed Serjeant Surgeon to King George V from 1910 to 1928, and was later Honorary Serjeant Surgeon to His Majesty. He was created a Baronet, of The Abbey Grange, Waltham Abbey, in the County of Essex and of Manchester Square in the Parish of St Marylebone in the County of London, on 20 March 1928.

== Family ==
Charles married Gertrude Seton Gordon, and they had two children, Sir Allen Aitcheson Havelock Charles, 2nd Baronet, and Sir Noel Charles, 3rd Baronet.

He died at his home in Manchester Square, London W1, and is buried in Brompton Cemetery, London.

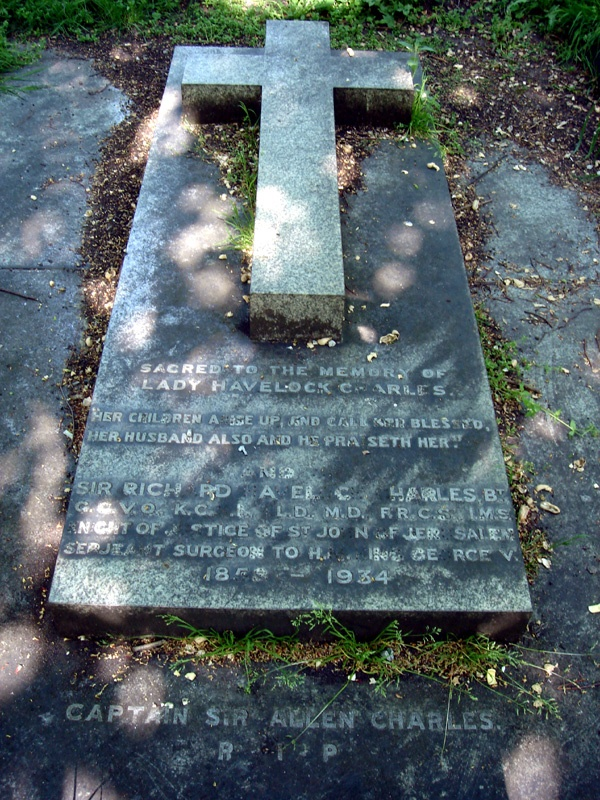
Funerary monument, Brompton Cemetery, London

He was succeeded as 2nd Baronet by his son, Captain Sir Allen Aitcheson Havelock Charles, who established the Richard Havelock Charles Scholarships and Medals at Queen's University Belfast in his honour.

Baronetage of the United Kingdom
New creation	Baronet (of The Abbey Grange and Manchester Square); 1928–1934	Succeeded by Allen Charles
