= 1946 British Embassy bombing =

Terrorist attack by Zionist militia Irgun

Coordinates: 41.90900797°N 12.50128161°E

- Part of spillover of the Jewish insurgency in Mandatory Palestine
- Location: Porta Pia, Rome
- Date: 31 October 1946
- Target: British Embassy; Ambassador Noel Charles
- Attack type: Bombing
- Weapon: Timed explosives encased in suitcases
- Perpetrator: Irgun
- Inquiry: Italian police, Carabinieri and the Allied Police Force

The bombing of the British Embassy at Porta Pia in Rome was a terrorist action perpetrated by the Irgun that occurred on 31 October 1946. Two suitcases containing timed explosives were planted near the embassy's front entrance; the resulting blast injured two people and damaged the building's residential section beyond repair. The Irgun targeted the embassy because they considered it an obstacle to illegal Jewish immigration into Mandatory Palestine. One of the Irgun's intended targets, ambassador Noel Charles, was away on leave during the attack. It was quickly determined that foreign militants from Mandatory Palestine were behind the attack and under pressure from Great Britain, the Italian police, Carabinieri and the Allied Police Force rounded up numerous members of the Betar organization, which had recruited militants from among the displaced refugees. Confirming fears of the expansion of Zionist political violence beyond Mandatory Palestine, the bombing of the embassy was the first attack against British personnel by the Irgun on European soil.

The British and Italian governments commenced an extensive investigation and concluded that Irgun operatives from Mandatory Palestine organized the attack. The attack was condemned by the leaders of Jewish agencies superintending their refugees. Italy subsequently enacted strict immigration reform and antisemitic sentiment heightened in the United Kingdom. The Italian government rounded up nine suspects, one of whom was shot and killed by the police during an escape attempt. However, the remaining eight suspects were later released from custody. During the early 1950s, Israel lobbied the British to pressure the Italian government not to pursue the militants. In 1952, the eight suspects–including ringleader Moishe Deitel–were tried in absentia and received light sentences ranging from 8 to 16 months.

== Background ==
The British government anticipated the threat of Jewish terrorism emanating outside Mandatory Palestine in the aftermath of the Second World War. The Irgun had been founded before the Holocaust out of discontent with the Haganah's policy of havlagah, or self-restraint. It became the armed wing of Revisionist Zionism in 1936, a turn related to the Arab recourse to insurrectionary violence in that year, itself a protest against British policy regarding Jewish immigration. Terrorism, the Irgun reasoned, was a winning tactic for it had enabled the Arabs to alter Great Britain's policy on Jewish migration into Palestine. The consequent White Paper of 1939 severely curtailed further Jewish immigration by imposing quotas and ignited a brief military response by the Irgun as well as its later offshoot Lehi, with both concluding that only campaigns of political violence targeting British personnel and installations could shift the British. The Irgun suspended these operations when the Second World War broke out some months later. News from occupied Europe of the Holocaust led them to undertake an insurrection in 1944 under the leadership of Menachem Begin. The Irgun also played a key role in organizing Aliyah Bet to enable clandestine Jewish immigration into Palestine, and is said to have singled out the embassy convinced that it was a centre of "anti Jewish intrigue" curbing illegal Jewish immigration to Palestine.

Before he retired as MI5's wartime Director General in May 1946, David Petrie offered an assessment of the threat of Jewish terrorism in Europe and a warning: "the red light is definitely showing". The alert was confirmed by his successor Sir Percy Sillitoe in August and September, when he designated the Irgun and Lehi as the possibly planning to assassinate prominent English figures outside the Middle East. MI5 considered Mandatory Palestine a priority within the British Empire and had Defence Security Officers (DSO) stationed within the Mandate, working with local criminal investigation departments (CID) as well as MI5"s sister agency the Secret Intelligence Service (SIS), to collect intel on Jewish terrorist threats to Britain. Their sources warned that the Irgun and Lehi were targeting British personnel outside Mandatory Palestine. MI5 were obliged to take these threats seriously: on 22 July 1946, the Irgun bombed the King David Hotel, housing British government offices, in Jerusalem, killing 91. A low intensity guerilla war was being waged in Palestine, with sabotage of communication lines and attacks on British soldiers and mandatory policemen, 99 being killed for the period 1 October through to 18 November. While the Haganah decided at this time to suspend its role in sabotage operations, the Irgun and the Lehi extended their operations to Europe to strike at British diplomatic representatives.

== Bombing ==
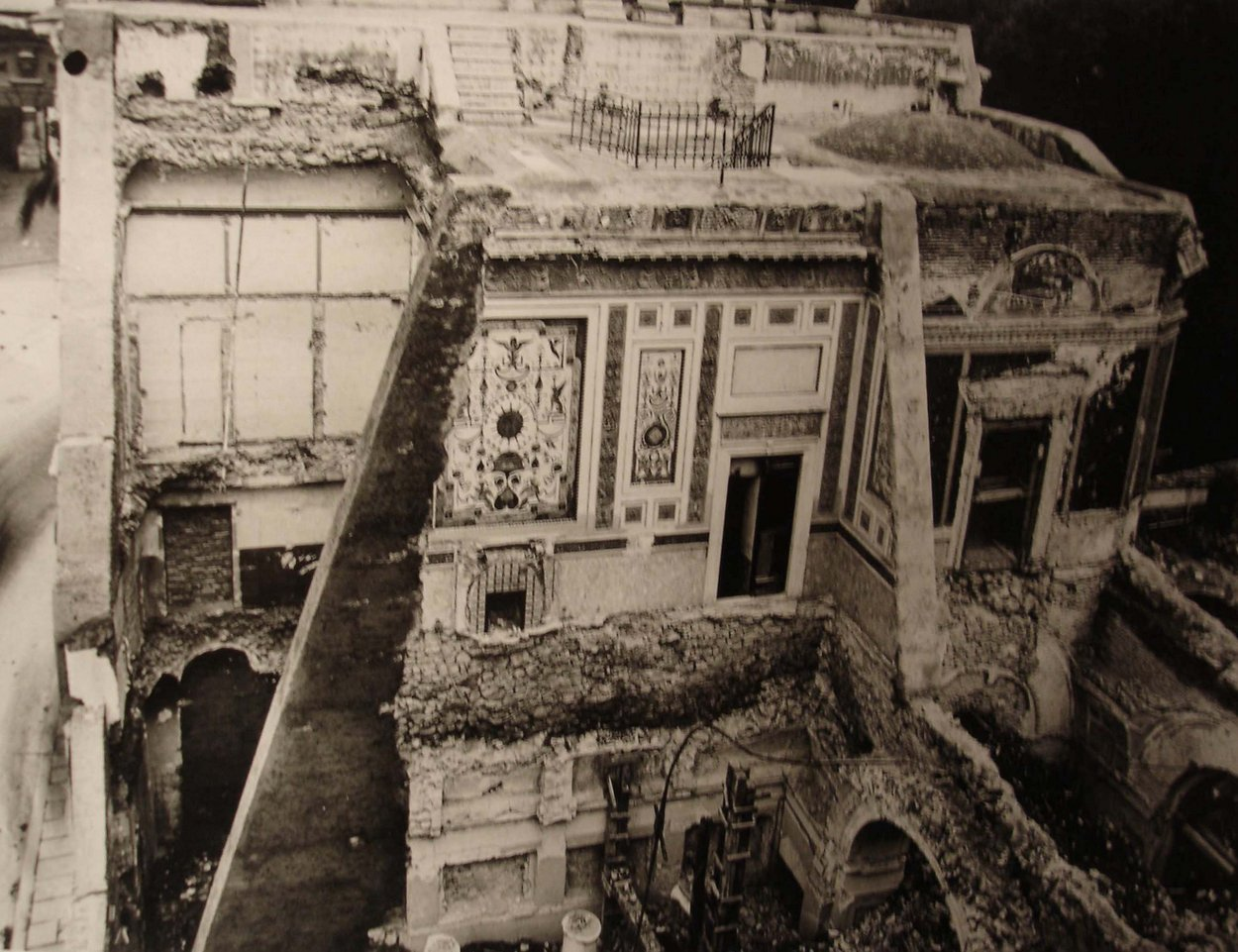
Remains of the British Embassy in Rome in 1946

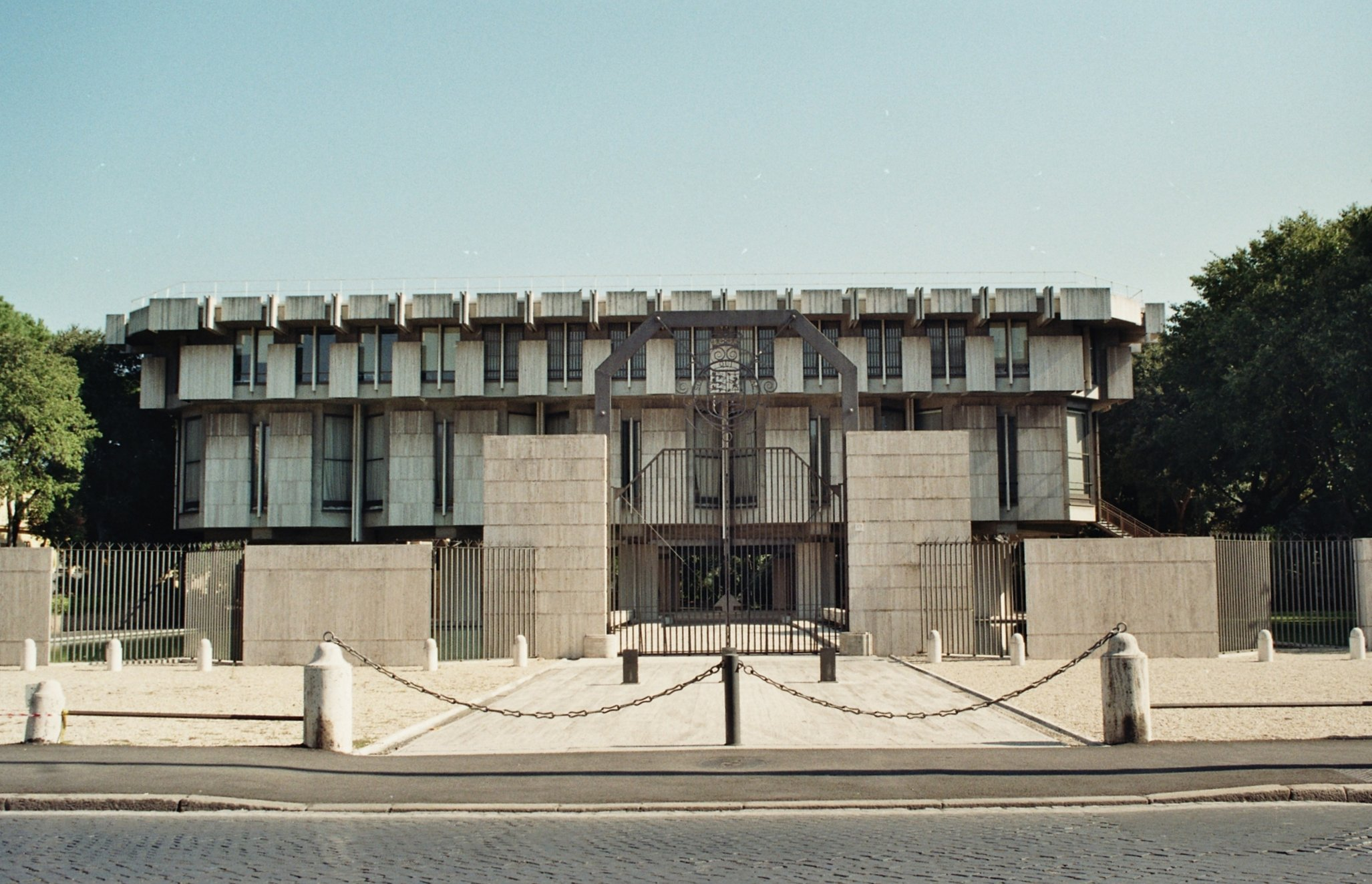
British Embassy in Rome in 2011

By November 1945 alone, it was calculated that some 15,000 Jewish refugees had managed to enter Italy over the preceding six months since the termination of hostilities; the country's geographical location was favorable for the traffic of refugees to Palestine. In September 1945, already engaged for several years in an insurgency against the British Mandatory authorities and army in Palestine, the Irgun high command dispatched a mission to Europe whose aim was to organize the flow of displaced Jewish survivors of the Holocaust to Palestine, recruit soldiers, engage in sabotage against Great Britain and coordinate activities among Zionist organizations sympathetic to the cause.

Eli Tavin, nicknamed Pesach, was appointed head of operations in the diaspora and set up the first logistical base for the group in Italy. Tavin found strong support there among Italian antifascist resistance groups, and, recruiting many members of the Betar organization among the refugees, many of the latter of whom, residing in camps run by UNRRA were also eager to participate, set up cells through the country, while establishing two schools to train commandos for operations at Tricase and Ladispoli. Already in March 1946, several refugees, Dov Gurwitz(Roumenian), Aba Churman (Polish), assisted by several others – Natan Rzepkowicz (Polish), Tiburzio Deitel (Fiume), Chono Steingarten (Polish) and Girsh Guta (Polish), had established an office of Jewish correspondence in via Sicilia 135, near the Allied Intelligenced offices, and this was chosen to become the central office for Irgun operations in Italy. (Note: "It was stated that two members of the Irgun Zvai Leumi were instructed last March to start a propaganda campaign in Rome and to establish a news exchange office, whereas it was the headquarters of the organisation in Italy." (CT 1946a, p. 1)) The British Embassy in Italy was considered by the Irgun to be a centre of operations hindering Jewish migration to Palestine, and thus was singled out as a target. (Note: "that the Irgum Svai Leumi was responsible for the bombing of the British Embassy in Rome. It was stated that the building was selected as it was the centre of operations hindering the repatriation of Jews." (CT 1946b, p. 2)) Planning for the operation was completed by early October. Before the war Zeev Jabotinsky's Betar movement had obtained permission from Mussolini to have militants train at a Naval College established in Civitavecchia under the auspices of the Italian fascist authorities. According to the historian of fascism Giuseppe Parlato, the Irgun had purchased from the post-war neofascist terrorist group FAR the explosives used for the attempt via the offices of its co-founder Pino Romualdi a fascist who had set up a secret repository of army munitions and explosives after war's end. Furio Biagini states that the material was taken from deposits located in a centre administered by UNRRA.

On the night of 31 October 1946, Irgun operatives divided into two squads: one daubed a large swastika on the front wall of the British Consulate, and the other planted two explosives, amounting to 40 kilos of TNT encased in suitcases and rigged to a timer on the steps of the embassy's front entrance in Via XX Settembre. A driver, working for the embassy, noticed the suitcases and entered the rear of the building to report them. A few moments later, at 02:43, the explosives detonated. The report of the explosion echoed throughout the entire city and was sufficiently powerful to shatter all the windows of the houses and apartments within a distance of one kilometre. The 350-children school of the Handmaids of the Sacred Heart was "badly damaged." The embassy's residential section was destroyed by the blast which created a gaping hole in the entranceway. Noel Charles–the British ambassador and main target of the attack–was away on leave though his quarters were heavily damaged. No British personnel were harmed, but two Italians, one a soldier who happened to be passing by and the other the embassy's concierge, suffered severe wounds that left them in a critical condition.

== Aftermath ==
The bombing was the first terrorist operation by the Irgun against British personnel in Europe; it resulted in both a setback for illegal Jewish immigration to Palestine, and a major public relations disaster for the mainstream Zionist movement.

The chief of the Italian police declared the following day that no Italian nationals were involved, that the incident bore the hallmarks of similar operations against the British in Palestine, and that those responsible were Jews from Palestine, dismissing rumours that Italian fascists might have been responsible. (Note: According to Paolo Mieli the archives of the Italian police and the carabinieri in 1948 indicate that the Italian Communist Party was also suspected of being responsible at the time (Mieli 2017).) An investigation was conducted by the Polizia di Stato with British and American assistance. On the 4 November the Irgun plastered streets in many Italian cities with notices proclaiming it was behind the explosion and released to an American journalist a communiqué claiming responsibility, which was duly reported in The Times on 6 November. The Irgun also threatened more coordinated attacks against Britain, and justified its actions by charging that the British were engaged in a "war of extermination" against Jews throughout the world. Soon three refugees were quickly arrested on suspicion, and another two detained on 4 November. The Irgun Zvai Leumi sabotage school was discovered in Rome, where pistols, ammunition, hand grenades, and training literature were found. Four other suspects were caught in Genova, and Tavin arrested in December. Among those arrested were Dow Gurwitz, Tiburzio Deitel, Michael Braun and David Viten.

Many were members of Betar. British authorities requested that those rounded up be handed over, for transfer to prison camps in British-occupied Eritrea. One of the arrested, Israel (Ze'ev) Epstein, a childhood friend of the Irgun leader Menachem Begin, attempted to flee from his imprisonment on 27 December 1946. He had been receiving assistance from the American League for a Free Palestine, which provided blankets, food and cash, but which denied sending him the rope with which he escaped. He was shot in the stomach after an Italian officer on the scene fired a warning shot and called on him to stop. He died of his wounds later that day. Eventually after reported pressure from the Allied Command, the suspects were released.

The distinguished Italian criminal lawyer Giovanni Persico, who was a friend of Jabotinsky's from their days at university, took on the suspects' defence. In November, the British media began to sensationalize the idea that Jewish terrorism was a threat to Britain itself, creating unsubstantiated accounts of other putative terrorist plots and activities. However, the American League for Free Palestine on behalf of Irgun and Irgun itself made the same threats as what the media was reporting. As a consequence, antisemitism in the United Kingdom increased. Though the Jewish leadership of displacement camps condemned the bombing, the attack had an adverse effect on refugees in Italy. Encouraged by Britain, the Italian government enacted several pieces of legislation, reforming their immigration policy. The government set a registry deadline for 31 March 1947 and imposed strict travel visa requirements. The Irgun bases of operations in Italy were closed down and shifted to other European capitals where operatives continued to strike at British targets: the Hotel Sacher in Vienna, which at the time was headquarters of the British Army in the area, to name just one. In order not to be outdone by the Irgun, the Lehi undertook similar operations against the Colonial Office in London, which the Scotland Yard unit investigating Jewish terrorist activities linked to the Embassy bombing, and only desisted from a plan to release a strain of cholera bacteria into London's underground water supply system by news that the British government had decided to leave Palestine. (Note: "Yaakov Eliav, capo delle operazioni del Lehi in Europa, rivelerà nelle sue memorie che, all'epoca, l'organizzazzione aveva progettato addirittura da disseminare dei bacilli di colera nelle condotte dell'acquedotto di Londra. I germi dovevano essere prelevati dalle colture dei laboratori dell'Instituto Pasteur, grazie alla complicità dei medici e degli impiegati che simpatizzavano per la causa ebraica. Secondo Eliav i preparativi per mettere in esecuzione questo spaventoso piano furono arrestati unicamente dalla decisione britannica di lasciare la Palestina."(Yaakov Eliav, head of Lehi operations in Europe, was later to reveal in his memoirs that, at this time, the organization had worked on nothing less than a plan to disseminate cholera bacteria in London's waterworks. The germs were to be obtained from cultures in the laboratories of the Pasteur Institute, thanks to the connivance of doctors and employees who were sympathetic to the Jewish cause. According to Eliav, preparations to execute this frightful plan were stopped only because of the British decision to withdraw from Palestine.) (Biagini 2004, pp. 90–91, 91)) According to Italian historian Furio Biagini, there was widespread international admiration for the perceived effectiveness of the Irgun and Lehi attacks in forcing the British to withdraw from Palestine. Biagini argued that the attacks were just as important as the activities of the Haganah and the diplomacy of the Jewish Agency in effecting the British withdrawal.

Five years following the bombing, the Israeli government urged Britain to pressure Italy not to pursue eight suspected perpetrators of the bombing who resided in Israel. Five of them had been arrested in Rome but had jumped bail and escaped, while three others had never been arrested. On 17 April 1952, the Italian government tried Moshe Deitel in absentia for his leading part in the bombing. Deitel was found guilty and sentenced to 16 months imprisonment. The seven other suspects were also convicted for taking part in the bombing and received eight-month sentences. The sentences, however, were immediately annulled by amnesties.

== See also ==
- List of Irgun attacks

== Sources ==
- Bagon, Paul (2003). The Impact of the Jewish Underground on Anglo Jewry (PDF) (M.Phil thesis). University of Oxford.
- Bell, J. Bowyer (1976). Terror Out of Zion: Fight for Israeli Independence. Transaction Publishers. pp. 178–181. ISBN 978-1-351-48660-6.
- Biagini, Furio (2004). "L'Irgun e la resistenza ebraica in Palestina. L'attentato all'ambasciata britannica di Roma (ottobre 1946)" [The Irgun and the Jewish Resistance in Palestine. The Bombing of the British Embassy in Rome (October 1946)]. Nuova Storia Contemporanea (in Italian). 8 (5): 75–92.
- "Eight Irgunists Convicted in Italy for Bombing of British Embassy". Jewish Telegraphic Agency. 21 April 1952.
- "EMBASSY BOMBING. AID FOR PRISONERS. An American's Admission". The West Australian. 31 December 1946a – via Trove. "I am paying retainers to two lawyers to defend and care for all those held in connection with the Embassy bombing. I write regular cheques for £25 to £30 with which the prisoners are supplied with blankets and food and what cash they need, but I do not touch parcels. I disbelieve the policy story of a rope having been smuggled to Epstein in an U.N.R.R.A. parcel, but Epstein probably bribed a guard for the rope, using money I sent through a lawyer."
- "Europe-Wide Search for Man Who Made Bomb". The Argus. A.A.P. 19 April 1947 – via Trove. "The bomb was of the same type as that used in the explosion at the British Embassy in Rome last year and in several other outrages by Jewish terrorists."
- Gremmo, Roberto (2009). L'ebraismo armato. L'"Irgun Zvai Leumi" e gli attentati antibritannici in Italia (1946-1948) [Armed Jewry: The "Irgun Zvai Leumi" and the Anti-British Attacks in Italy (1946–1948)] (in Italian). Biella: Storia Ribelle.
- Heller, Joseph (2012). The Stern Gang: Ideology, Politics and Terror, 1940-1949. Routledge. ISBN 978-1-136-29887-5.
- Hoffman, Bruce (2015). Anonymous Soldiers: The Struggle for Israel, 1917-1947. Knopf Doubleday Publishing Group. ISBN 978-1-101-87466-0.
- "Irgun Leaflet Bombs Explode in Rome, Venice, Threaten British Forces". Jewish Telegraphic Agency. 12 January 1947.
- "Italians and British Envoy in Charge". The Daily Telegraph. 2 November 1946.
- "Jew Terrorism. War Against Britain". The West Australian. 13 January 1947 – via Trove. "leaflet bombs were exploded on Friday by Irgun Zvai Leumi (the Jewish terrorist organisation) in Rome, Venice, Bari, Florence and Turin. "The vanguard of the clandestine Jewish army of liberation, with headquarters in Italy, means to destroy the British forces until the Jewish State is restored," the leaflets read"
- "Jew Terrorists. War on Britain. "Into the Heart."". The West Australian. 4 November 1946b – via Trove. "Jewish terrorists are planning to carry their underground war into the heart of Britain, according to the diplomatic correspondent of the "Evening News," who says that this was decided on at a secret conference of their "general staff" held in Palestine during the Paris Conference. The time bombs which exploded at the British Embassy in Rome early on Thursday morning, causing the front of the building to collapse, constituted the first blow in this war."
- "Jewish Terrorists Blamed for Attack on British Embassy". The Canberra Times. 25 December 1946a – via Trove.
- "Jewish Threat to Britain. Extensive Underground War Planned". The Recorder. 4 November 1946 – via Trove. "the bomb outrage at the British Embassy in Rome was the first blow of this war."
- "Jews Arrested for Bombing Of British Embassy". The Canberra Times. 25 December 1946 – via Trove. "police discovered that the Palestine terrorist organisation, Irgun Zvai Leumi, had established a sabotage school in Rome"
- "Jews Behind Rome Plot, Police Think". The Argus. 2 November 1946 – via Trove. "suitcases containing explosives deposited on the doorstep of the main entrance, and two cards fixed to a near by wall. These read: "Attenzione-Miny." "Miny" is the Jewish spelling for mine. An Italian would have written "mine.""
- Kokkonen, Susanna (25 April 2008). "Jewish Displaced Persons in Postwar Italy, 1945-1951". Jerusalem Center for Public Affairs.
- Laurens, Henry (2002). La Question de Palestine, tome 2: Une mission sacrée de civilisation (1922-1947) [The Question of Palestine, Volume 2: A Sacred Mission of Civilization (1922-1947)] (in French). Fayard. ISBN 978-2-213-70358-9.
- Liebreich, F. (2004). Britain's Naval and Political Reaction to the Illegal Immigration of Jews to Palestine, 1945-1949. Taylor & Francis. ISBN 978-1-135-76694-8.
- Medoff, Rafael; Waxman, Chaim I. (2013). Historical Dictionary of Zionism. Routledge. ISBN 978-1-135-96649-2.
- Mieli, Paolo (2017), Il caos italiano: Alle radici del nostro dissesto [The Italian Chaos: The Roots of Our Disaster] (in Italian), Rizzoli, ISBN 978-88-586-9122-9
- Pannullo, Antonio (31 October 2016). "40 chili di tritolo nel cuore di Roma: così nel 1946 l'Irgun distrusse l'ambasciata inglese" [40 kilos of TNT in the heart of Rome: this is how the Irgun destroyed the British Embassy in 1946.]. Secolo d'Italia (in Italian).
- Parlato, Giuseppe (2006). Fascisti senza Mussolini: le origini del neofascismo in Italia, 1943-1948 [Fascists without Mussolini: The Origins of Neo-Fascism in Italy, 1943–1948] (in Italian). Bologna: Il Mulino.
- Parlato, Giuseppe (2015). "Neofascismo italiano e questione razziale" [Italian neo-fascism and the racial question]. In Resta, Giorgio; Zeno-Zencovich, Vincenzo (eds.). Le leggi razziali: Passato/Presente [The Racial Laws: Past/Present] (in Italian). RomaTrE-Press. pp. 147–180. ISBN 978-88-97524-35-9.
- "Police Say Woman Bomb "Planter" Now in Custody". The Age. 13 June 1947b – via Trove. "Officers of the special branch of Scotland Yard who have been investigating Jewish terrorist activities are satisfied the man who made the bomb is also under arrest [...] New facts brought to light link it with the bomb incident at the British Embassy in Rome on October 31, 1946."
- "Princess Elizabeth Threatened". The Border Watch. 7 June 1947 – via Trove. "Jewish terrorist chief known as "Big Brother" says Reuter's correspondent in Rome. This chief claimed recently that the Irgun Zvai Leumi terrorist organisation planned to assassinate Princess Elizabeth. He added that his organisation would attack the centre of London and Buckingham Palace itself."
- Quaderni della FIAP (in Italian), vol. 50, Federazione italiana delle associazioni partigiane, Bastogi, 1987
- "Responsibility for Bomb Outrage". The Canberra Times. 5 November 1946b – via Trove.
- "Rome School Damaged in Bomb Outrage". The Southern Cross. 29 November 1946 – via Trove. "The school conducted by the Handmaids of the Sacred Heart, opposite to the British Embassy here which was badly damaged in the recent bomb outrage"
- "TERRORISM EXTENDS - Defiant Interview". The Age. 13 January 1947a – via Trove. "The Irgun Zvai Leumi will attack military objectives from England to Palestine. Jewish military resistance will reach into the heart of the British Empire"
- "Terrorist Shot". The Age. 30 December 1946 – via Trove. "Z. E. W. Epstein, a Polish Jewish professor, who was arrested in connection with the bombing of the British embassy in Rome, and wno was shot while trying to escape, died last night."
- "Terrorists had H.Q. in Rome". The Newcastle Herald. 25 December 1946 – via Trove. "Police found at the headquarters pistols, ammunition, hand grenades, a German treatise on sabotage, and hand-written messages from the Irgun commander."
- Toscano, Mario (2010). "L'Italia e l'Aliyà Bet" [Italy and the Aliyah Bet]. In Paganoni, Marco (ed.). Per ricostruire e ricostruirsi. Astorre Mayer e la rinascita ebraica tra Italia e Israele [To Rebuild and Rebuild Oneself. Astorre Mayer and the Jewish Rebirth between Italy and Israel] (in Italian). Franco Angeli. pp. 75–88. ISBN 978-88-568-2783-5.
- Walton, Calder (2008). "British Intelligence and the Mandate of Palestine: Threats to British National Security Immediately After the Second World War". Intelligence and National Security. 23 (4): 435–462. doi:10.1080/02684520802293049. S2CID 154775965.
- Walton, Calder (2011). "British Intelligence and Threats to British National Security After the Second World War". In Grant, Matthew (ed.). The British Way in Cold Warfare: Intelligence, Diplomacy and the Bomb 1945-1975. A&C Black. pp. 141–158. ISBN 978-1-4411-0627-8.
