= List of speakers in Plato's dialogues =

The following is a list of the speakers found in the dialogues traditionally ascribed to Plato, including extensively quoted, indirect and conjured speakers. Dialogues, as well as Platonic Epistles and Epigrams, in which these individuals appear dramatically but do not speak are listed separately.

== List ==
Name	Speaker	Mentioned
Adeimantus of Collytus, son of Ariston	Parmenides, Republic	Apology
Agathon of Athens, son of Tisamenus	Symposium	Protagoras; Epigram 6
Alcibiades of Scambonidae, son of Clinias	Alcibiades, II Alcibiades, Protagoras, Symposium	Euthydemus, Gorgias
Antiphon of Athens, son of Pyrilampes	Parmenides	
Anytus of Euonymon, son of Anthemion	Meno	Apology
Apollodorus of Phalerum	Symposium	Apology, Phaedo
Aristides of Alopece, son of Lysimachus	Laches, Theages	Theaetetus
Aristodemus of Cydathenaeum	Symposium	
Aristophanes of Cydathenaeum, son of Philippus	Symposium	Apology; Epigram 18
Aristotle of Thorae, son of Timocrates	Parmenides	
Aspasia of Miletus, daughter of Axiochus	Menexenus	
Axiochus of Scambonidae, son of Alcibiades	Axiochus	Euthydemus
Callias of Alopece, son of Hipponicus	Apology, Protagoras	Axiochus, Cratylus, Eryxias, Philebus, Protagoras, Theaetetus
Callicles of Acharnae	Gorgias	
Cebes of Thebes	Phaedo	Crito; Epistle XIII
Cephalus of Clazomenae	Parmenides	
Cephalus of Syracuse, son of Lysanias	Republic	Phaedrus
Chaerephon of Sphettus	Charmides, Gorgias, Halcyon	Apology
Charmides of Athens, son of Glaucon	Charmides, Theages	Axiochus, Protagoras, Symposium
Clinias of Cnossos	Epinomis, Laws	
Clinias of Scambonidae, son of Axiochus	Axiochus, Euthydemus	
Clitophon of Athens, son of Aristonymus	Clitophon, Republic	
Cratylus of Athens, son of Smicrion	Cratylus	
Critias of Athens, son of Callaeschrus	Charmides, Protagoras	Eryxias
Critias of Athens, son of Leaides	Critias, Timaeus	
Crito of Alopece	Crito, Euthydemus, Phaedo	Apology
Ctesippus of Paeania	Euthydemus, Lysis	Phaedo
Demodocus of Anagyrus	Theages	Apology, Demodocus
Dionysodorus of Chios and Thurii	Euthydemus	
Diotima of Mantinea	Symposium	
Echecrates of Phlius	Phaedo	
Erasistratus of Athens	Eryxias	
Eryxias of Steiria	Eryxias	
Eryximachus of Athens, son of Acumenus	Symposium	Phaedrus, Protagoras
Euclides of Megara	Theaetetus	Phaedo
Eudicus of Athens, son of Apemantus	(Lesser) Hippias	(Greater) Hippias
Euthydemus of Chios and Thurii	Euthydemus	Cratylus
Euthyphro of Prospalta	Euthyphro	Cratylus
Glaucon of Collytus, son of Ariston	Parmenides, Republic, Symposium	
Gorgias of Leontini, son of Charmantides	Gorgias	Apology, (Greater) Hippias, Meno, Phaedrus, Philebus, Symposium, Theages
Hermocrates of Syracuse, son of Hermon	Critias, Timaeus	
Hermogenes of Alopece, son of Hipponicus	Cratylus	Phaedo
Hippias of Elis, son of Diopeithes	(Greater) Hippias, (Lesser) Hippias, Protagoras	Apology, Phaedrus, Protagoras
Hippocrates of Athens, son of Apollodorus	Protagoras	
Hippothales of Athens, son of Hieronymus	Lysis	
Ion of Ephesus	Ion	
Laches of Aexone, son of Melanopus	Laches	Symposium
Lysias of Thurii and Athens, son of Cephalus	Phaedrus	Clitophon, Phaedrus, Republic
Lysimachus of Alopece, son of Aristides	Laches	Meno, On Virtue, Theaetetus, Theages
Lysis of Aexone, son of Democrates	Lysis	
Megillus of Sparta	Laws	Epinomis
Melesias of Alopece, son of Thucydides	Laches	Meno, On Virtue, Theages
Meletus of Pithus, son of Meletus	Apology	Euthyphro, Theaetetus
Menexenus of Athens, son of Demophon	Lysis, Menexenus	Phaedo
Meno of Pharsalus, son of Alexidemus	Meno	
Nicias of Cydantidae, son of Niceratus	Laches	Gorgias, Republic, Theages
Parmenides of Elea, son of Pyres	Parmenides	Sophist, Symposium, Theaetetus
Pausanias of Cerameis	Symposium	Protagoras
Phaedo of Elis	Phaedo	
Phaedrus of Myrrhinus, son of Pythocles	Phaedrus, Symposium	Protagoras; Epigram 4
Philebus	Philebus	
Polemarchus of Thurii, son of Cephalus	Republic	Phaedrus
Polus of Acragas	Gorgias	Phaedrus, Theages
Prodicus of Ceos	Eryxias, Protagoras	Apology, Axiochus, Charmides, Cratylus, Eryxias, Euthydemus, (Greater) Hippias, Laches, Phaedrus, Protagoras, Republic, Symposium, Theaetetus, Theages
Protagoras of Abdera	Protagoras, Theaetetus	Cratylus, Euthydemus, (Greater) Hippias, Laws, Phaedrus, Republic, Sophist, Theaetetus
Protarchus of Athens, son of Callias	Philebus	
Pythodorus of Athens, son of Isolochus	Parmenides	Alcibiades
Simmias of Thebes	Phaedo	Crito, Phaedrus; Epistle XIII
Sisyphus of Pharsalus	Sisyphus	
Socrates of Alopece, son of Sophroniscus	Dialogues of Plato	Epistles II, VII, XIII
Socrates of Athens	Statesman	Sophist, Theaetetus; Epistle XI
Terpsion of Megara	Theaetetus	Phaedo
Theaetetus of Sunium, son of Euphronius	Sophist, Theaetetus	Statesman
Theages of Anagyrus, son of Demodocus	Theages	Apology, Republic
Theodorus of Cyrene	Sophist, Statesman, Theaetetus	
Thrasymachus of Chalcedon	Republic	Clitophon, Phaedrus
Thucydides of Alopece, son of Melesias	Laches	Theages
Timaeus of Epizephyrian Locris	Critias, Timaeus	
Timarchus	Theages	
Xanthippe, wife of Socrates of Alopece	Phaedo	Halcyon; Epigram 8
Zeno of Elea	Parmenides	Alcibiades, Sophist

Unnamed speakers

Name	Mentioned
Callias' slave	Protagoras
Euclides' slave	Theaetetus
Meno's slave of Pharsalus	Meno
Polemarchus' slave	Republic
Public slave	Phaedo
Stranger from Athens	Epinomis, Laws
Stranger from Elea	Sophist, Statesman
Unnamed friends	Eryxias, Hipparchus, Minos, On Justice, On Virtue, Protagoras, Rival Lovers, Symposium

== Bibliography ==
- Debra Nails. The People of Plato: A Prosopography of Plato and Other Socratics. Hackett Publishing, 2002. ISBN 0-87220-564-9.
- Plato. Complete Works. Ed: John M. Cooper. Hackett Publishing, 1997.
