= Stephanus pagination =

System of paginating Plato's works

Volume 1, Page 142 of the 1578 Stephanus edition of Plato, showing the opening of Theaetetus

Stephanus pagination is a system of reference and organization used in modern editions and translations of Plato's works, based on the three-volume 1578 edition of Plato's complete works translated by Joannes Serranus (Jean de Serres) and published by Henricus Stephanus (Henri Estienne) in Geneva.

== Overview ==
In the case of Plato's works, Stephanus pagination first divides the works into numbers that are the page numbers of each of the Stephanus edition's three volumes, and each such page and page number is further subdivided into lettered sections which correspond to parallel Greek/Latin translated passages on a given page, mostly commonly a, b, c, d, and e. This system is used in modern scholarship to cite Plato. For Plato's works, unique coordinates for a passage can therefore be given with three pieces of information: the work's name, the (Stephanus) page number, and the letter denoting the passage. For example, "Symposium 172a" cites Symposium, Stephanus page 172 (the volume in which Symposium occurs, as it happens, volume 3), passage a. To avoid ambiguity in this scheme, either the Platonic work or the volume must be cited; absent this, "page 50" might refer to any of the "page 50s" across Stephanus' three volumes. Reference to Stephanus manifestly presupposes the existing ordering of the work in its given volumes, but given historical disagreement as to the chronology and proper ordering of Plato's works, care should therefore be taken when referring to Stephanus pagination as opposed to another scheme.

More specific citations may add line numbers, e.g. Symposium 209a5–9, but these generally refer to the lines in John Burnet's Oxford Classical Text, not to Estienne's line divisions.

There are some peculiarities in the Stephanus page numbers. The length of each page and each paragraph can vary if extra commentary appears on the page of the 1578 edition. Thus Stephanus pages are not all of the same length. Some pages do not have all the paragraphs a through e. There are also gaps in the sequence of Stephanus page numbers for Plato's Republic and Laws. The reason is that the editors added separate introductions to each 'book' of these longer works, and thus the page numbers of these introductions are not used to refer to pages in Plato's dialogues.

The spurious dialogue Halcyon was included in the corpus of Lucian's works and does not have Stephanus numbers.

Bekker numbering is the comparable system for the works of Aristotle, and Diels–Kranz numbering is the comparable system for Pre-Socratic philosophy. Unlike Stephanus pagination, Bekker numbering starts with page 1 and proceeds through all of Aristotle's works without starting over, regardless of the number of volumes needed for a given edition. Bekker numbering therefore has the advantage, not shared by Stephanus pagination, of giving compact, unambiguous numerical citation of a given passage, page, etc, without the absolute necessity in order to avoid ambiguity to specify the dialogue, work or volume which exists in the case of Stephanus.

== Stephanus numbers for Plato’s works ==
=== Volume 1 ===
- (2a–16a) Euthyphro
- (17a–42a) Apologia Socratis
- (43a–54e) Crito
- (57a–118a) Phaedo
- (121a–131a) Theages
- (132a–139a) Amatores
- (142a–210d) Theaetetus
- (216a–268b) Sophista
- (271a–307c) Euthydemus
- (309a–362a) Protagoras
- (363a–376c) Hippias Minor
- (383a–440e) Cratylus
- (447a–527e) Gorgias
- (530a–542b) Ion

=== Volume 2 ===
- (11a–67b) Philebus
- (70a–100b) Meno
- (103a–135e) Alcibiades I
- (138a–151c) Alcibiades II
- (153a–176d) Charmides
- (178a–201c) Laches
- (203a–223b) Lysis
- (225a–232c) Hipparchus
- (234a–249e) Menexenus
- (257a–311c) Politicus
- (313a–321d) Minos
- Respublica

- (327a–354c) Respublica I
- (357a–383c) Respublica II
- (386a–417b) Respublica III
- (419a–445e) Respublica IV
- (449a–480a) Respublica V
- (484a–511e) Respublica VI
- (514a–541b) Respublica VII
- (543a–569c) Respublica VIII
- (571a–592b) Respublica IX
- (595a–621d) Respublica X

- Leges

- (624a–650b) Leges I
- (652a–674c) Leges II
- (676a–702e) Leges III
- (704a–724b) Leges IV
- (726a–747e) Leges V
- (751a–785b) Leges VI
- (788a–824a) Leges VII
- (828a–850c) Leges VIII
- (853a–882c) Leges IX
- (884a–910d) Leges X
- (913a–938c) Leges XI
- (941a–969d) Leges XII

- (973a–992e) Epinomis

=== Volume 3 ===
- (17a–92c) Timaeus
- (106a–121c) Critias
- (126a–166c) Parmenides
- (172a–223d) Symposium
- (227a–279c) Phaedrus
- (281a–304e) Hippias Major
- (309a–363e) Epistolae
  - (309a–310b) Epistola I
  - (310b–315a) Epistola II
  - (315a–319e) Epistola III
  - (320a–321c) Epistola IV
  - (321c–322c) Epistola V
  - (322c–323d) Epistola VI
  - (323d–352a) Epistola VII
  - (352b–357d) Epistola VIII
  - (357d–358b) Epistola IX
  - (358b–358c) Epistola X
  - (358d–359c) Epistola XI
  - (359c–359e) Epistola XII
  - (360a–363e) Epistola XIII
- (364a–372a) Axiochus
- (372a–375d) De Justitia
- (376a–379d) De Virtute
- (380a–386b) Demodocus
- (387b–391d) Sisyphus
- (392a–406a) Eryxias
- (406a–410e) Clitopho
- (411a–416a) Definitiones

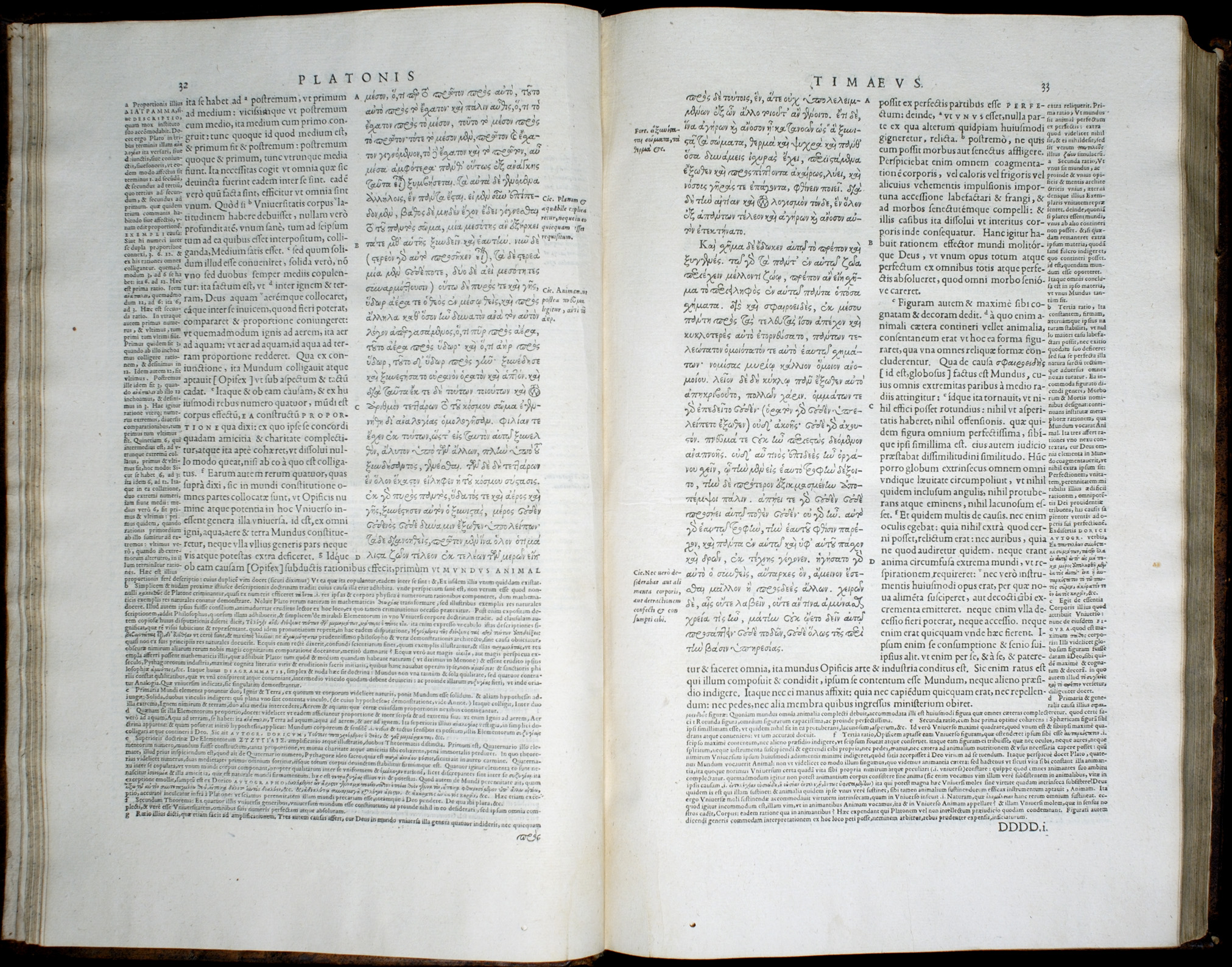
Volume 3, pages 32–33, of the 1578 Stephanus edition of Plato, showing a passage of Timaeus with the Latin translation and notes of Jean de Serres

== See also ==
- Bekker numbering
- Diels–Kranz numbering
