= Pseudo-Platonica =

Works falsely attributed to Plato

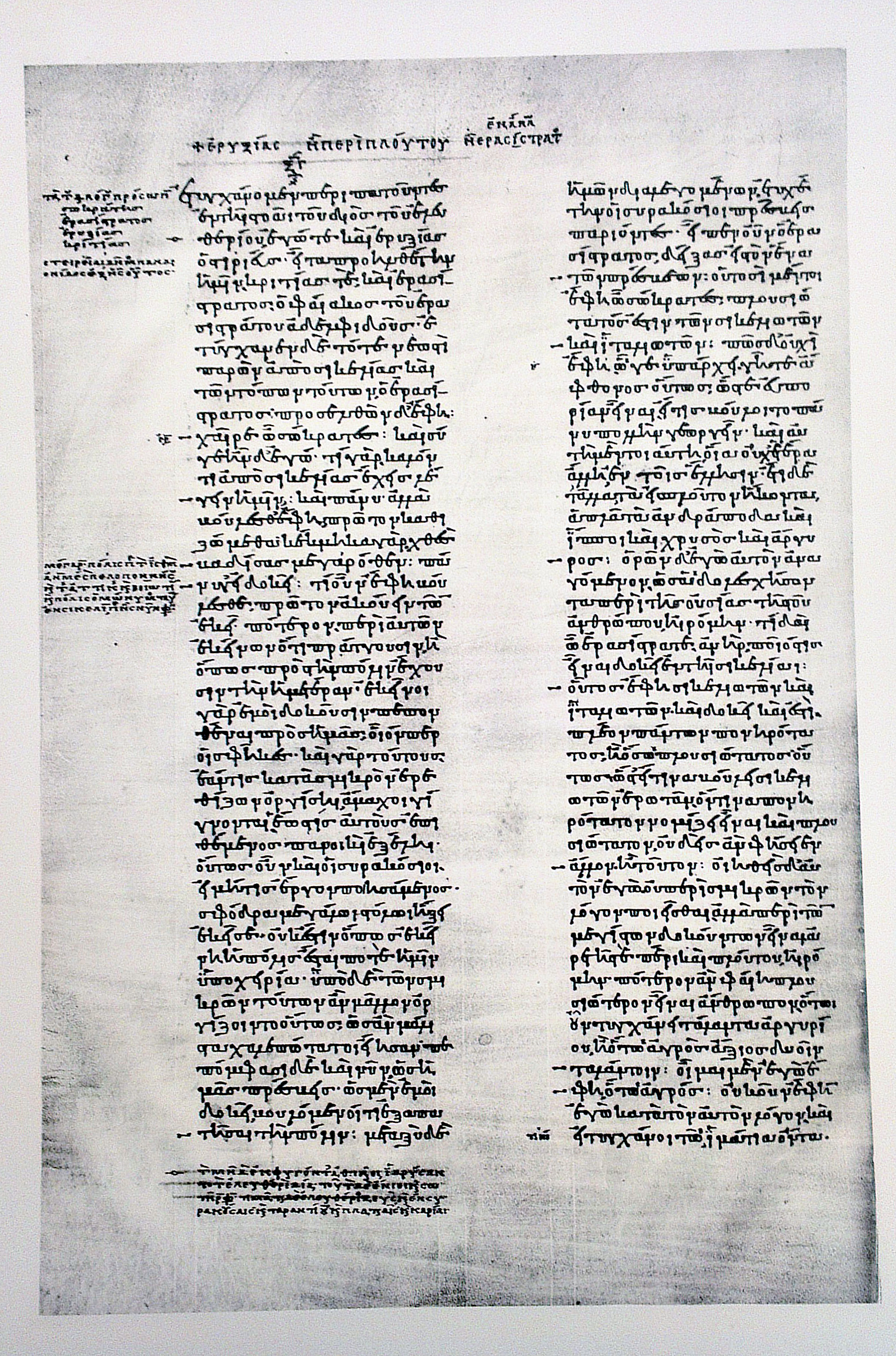
Start of Eryxias in the Codex Parisinus graecus 1807 from around AD 900. This dialogue was regarded as spurious even in antiquity, but was included in the standard collection of Plato's works.

Those works which have been falsely attributed to Plato, whether through error or forgery, are collectively known as Pseudo-Platonica. There are two main groups of such works.

The first is those Greek works which were attributed to Plato in antiquity and circulated alongside his authentic writings. These can be subdivided into two groups: the spuria, which were considered spurious already in antiquity, and the dubia, the authenticity of which has been doubted only since the rise of modern scholarship. While there is broad agreement regarding some dubia, others are disputed.

The second major group is the Arabic Pseudo-Platonica of the Middle Ages. These range from false quotations of Plato in the wisdom literature and works of theology based on Plotinus and Proclus to whole works attributed to Plato on morality, economics and occult science. The last category—works on the occult, magic, alchemy, etc.—is the most remote from the historical Plato.

== Ancient pseudepigrapha ==
The Platonic corpus, the ancient canon of Plato's works compiled by Thrasyllus of Mendes, contains 36 writings grouped into nine tetralogies: 35 dialogues and one set of 13 letters. Thrasyllus also included in his collection six works he regarded as spurious, not being by Plato, plus a seventh, the Definitions, which, while not by Plato personally, was a product of his Academy. To this corpus may be added 31 epigrams attributed to Plato from antiquity. They are generally regarded as spurious, although some have argued for the authenticity a few.

The six dialogues designated spurious in the corpus are all accepted as such by modern scholars. Usually called the Appendix Platonica, they are Eryxias, Axiochus, On Justice, On Virtue, Sisyphus and Demodocus. The Appendix was added to the tetralogies by the middle of the 1st century BC. The dialogue Halcyon, sometimes attributed to Plato in antiquity and since medieval times also to Lucian, has generally been excluded from the Platonic corpus in modern printed editions.

Questions were raised in antiquity over the authenticity of four of the dialogues accepted as authentic by Thrasyllus: Epinomis, Second Alcibiades, Hipparchus and Amatores. Modern scholars are generally agreed that these works are not by Plato. Since the early 19th century, doubts have been expressed about several other works in the corpus, which are now often labeled dubia. All of the letters are now generally regarded as spurious (i.e.,dubia but not spuria), although the Seventh Letter has defenders. The dialogues Theages and Minos are generally regarded spurious (i.e.,dubia but not spuria) and serious doubts have been expressed about First Alcibiades, Greater Hippias and Clitophon. Less serious doubt has also been expressed about Lesser Hippias and Menexenus. All of the dubia have defenders, but almost no scholars defend the spuria.

For all of the ancient pseudo-Platonic dialogues, it is impossible to say if they were originally published under Plato's name or if they were only attributed to him later. The concept of pseudepigrapha does not entail that they were forgeries. Some works may have circulated anonymously or under other names before being attributed to Plato to enhance their authority or commercial value or else to resolve uncertainty.

In addition to the surviving works of the Appendix Platonica, Diogenes Laertius in his Lives of the Eminent Philosophers cites five other works attributed to Plato as spurious: Midon (or Horsebreeder), Phaeacians, Chelidon, Seventh Day and Epimenides. These works have not survived.

== Arabic pseudepigrapha ==
An 18th-century copy of the Testament to Aristotle

No complete translation of any authentic work of Plato is known to have been made into Arabic in the Middle Ages. Contact with the genuine Platonic corpus came through commentaries, paraphrases and the translation of Galen's Synopsis of the dialogues. More influential than the actual Plato was the pseudepigrapha composed in or travelling under his name.

Rüdiger Arnzen identifies three main groups of Arabic Pseudo-Platonica. The one most detached from the historical Plato concerns occult, hermetic, alchemical, astrological and magical through and practice. These include the dialogues Summa Platonis and Kitāb al-rawābīʿ (Book of Tetralogies). Another work, the Kitāb muṣaḥḥaḥāt Aflāṭūn (Book of the Rectifications to Plato), presents pseudepigraphal Platonic material through the equally pseudepigraphal Pseudo-Jābir. The Kitāb al-nawāmīs (Book of Laws) is a collection of magical experiments purporting to be a translation of Plato's Laws. Much of the occult Pseudo-Platonica was translated into Latin in the Middle Ages.

Another group consists of practical pedagogical works on morality, politics and economics. This includes the so-called "Platonic testaments", which are Neo-Pythagorean in outlook, such as the Waṣīya fī taʾdīb al-aḥdāth (Testament on the Education of the Young). Both the Waṣīya and the Testament to Aristotle were included in the Ḥikma of Miskawayh. The Testament to Aristotle was translated into Persian by Naṣīr al-Dīn Ṭūsī.

Arnzen's third group of Pseudo-Platonica consists of quotations and excerpts attributed to Plato in the Neoplatonic Plotiniana Arabica (such as the Theology of Aristotle) and Procliana Arabica (such as the Liber de causis). These excerpts inspired the Platonism of Suhrawardī and his followers.

In addition, Plato was a popular authority in Arabic gnomologies and doxographies. These contain both authentic and spurious Platonic quotations. Taqwīm al-siyāsa al-mulûkīya ('The Correct Policy for Kings'), a gnomology dedicated strictly to Plato from around AD 1000, contains both authentic and inauthentic material, all placed under Plato's name seemingly to enhance its authority and value. The Arabic gnomological sources were influential in the West, transmitting Pseudo-Platonic sayings to the De vita et moribus philosophorum and the Dictes and Sayings of the Philosophers. Arnzen distinguishes "the vulgarized Plato of gnomological and doxographical anthologies and popular wisdom literature" from "the pseudepigraphic Plato of gnostic, occult, and Neoplatonic writings". All the Arabic traditions of Plato were combined in the 12th and 13th centuries, although Plato himself was a relatively minor figure in late Islamic Platonism.

== Pseudo-Platonica in Syriac ==
No complete translation of any genuine work of Plato into Syriac is known, but several Pseudo-Platonica were translated. There is a version of the Definitions different from the Greek version that is known from a 7th-century Syriac manuscript. Three manuscripts of the 7th through 9th centuries preserve the Instruction of Plato to His Disciple, not known in any Greek version. On the Subsistence of Soul's Virtues, another Pseudo-Platonic work originally written in Greek, was translated into Syriac in the 9th century. It is quoted extensively by John of Dara in his Treatise on the Soul. Neither the Greek nor the Syriac text survives, but an Arabic translation is known under the title Maqāla fī ithbāt faḍāʾil al-nafs. The Greek original probably dates to the "late Hellenistic" period while the Arabic was translated from the Syriac before 950.

Pseudo-Platonic quotations can be found in Antony of Tagrit's Rhetoric. Pseudo-Plato is well represented in Syriac gnomologies, where he usually offers ethical advice from an ascetic perspective. These are mostly derived from Greek gnomologies, although Bar Hebraeus' Laughable Stories also used Arabic sources. According to Bar Hebraeus,

Plato said, "The fool is known by two things: by his much speaking about that which benefiteth him not, and by his giving answers about subjects concerning which men ask him not."

== Bibliography ==
- Arberry, A. J. (1971). "Plato's 'Testament to Aristotle'". Bulletin of the School of Oriental and African Studies. 34 (3): 475–490. doi:10.1017/S0041977X00128496.
- Arnzen, Rüdiger (2009). "On The Contents, Sources and Composition of two Arabic Pseudo-Platonica: Multaqatāt Aflātun al-ilāhī and Fiqar ultuqitat wa-jumiʿat ʿan Aflātun". Oriens. 37: 7–52. doi:10.1163/007865209X12555048403295.
- Arnzen, Rüdiger (2011). "Plato, Arabic". In Henrik Lagerlund (ed.). Encyclopedia of Medieval Philosophy. Springer. pp. 1012–1016.
- Arzhanov, Yury. "Plato in Syriac Literature". Le Muséon. 132 (1–2): 1–36. doi:10.2143/MUS.132.1.3286532.
- Brock, Sebastian (2012). "Some Syriac Pseudo-Platonic Curiosities". In M. Afifi al-Haytham; Charles Burnett; Rotraud Hansberger (eds.). Medieval Arabic Thought: Essays in Honour of Fritz Zimmermann. Warburg Institute. pp. 19–26.
- Budge, E. A. Wallis, ed. (1897). The Laughable Stories Collected by Mâr Gregory John Bar Hebræus. Luzac and Co.
- Chroust, A.-H. (1998). "The Organization of the Corpus Platonicum in Antiquity". In Nicholas D. Smith (ed.). Plato: Critical Assessments. Vol. I: General Issues of Interpretation. Routledge. pp. 3–16.
- Cooper, John M., ed. (1997). Plato: Complete Works. Hackett Publishing.
- Daiber, Hans (1971). "Ein bisher unbekannter pseudoplatonischer Text über die Tugenden der Seele in arabischer Überlieferung". Der Islam. 47 (1): 25–42. doi:10.1515/islm.1971.47.1.25.
- Döring, Klaus; Erler, Michael; Schorn, Stefan, eds. (2005). Pseudoplatonica: Akten des Kongresses zu den Pseudoplatonica vom 6.–9. Juli 2003 in Bamberg. Franz Steiner.
- Gutas, Dimitri (1975). Greek Wisdom Literature in Arabic Translation: A Study of the Graeco-Arabic Gnomologia. American Oriental Society.
- Gutas, Dimitri (1994). "Pre-Plotinian Philosophy in Arabic (Other Than Platonism and Aristotelianism): A Review of the Sources". In Wolfgang Haase; Hildegard Temporini (eds.). Aufstieg und Niedergang der Römischen Welt. Vol. 36.7, Part II: Principate. De Gruyter. pp. 4939–4973.
- Hasse, Dag Nikolaus (2002). "Plato arabico-latinus: Philosophy – Wisdom Literature – Occult Sciences". In Stephen Gersh; Maarten J. F. M. Hoenen (eds.). The Platonic Tradition in the Middle Ages: A Doxographic Approach. De Gruyter. pp. 31–65. doi:10.1515/9783110908497.31. ISBN 978-3-11-090849-7.
- Heidel, William Arthur (1896). Pseudo-Platonica (PhD diss.). The Friedenwald Company.
- Hugonnard-Roche, Henri (2009). "Platon syriaque". In M. Amir-Moezzi (ed.). Pensée grecque et sagesse d'orient: Hommage à Michel Tardieu. Brepols. pp. 307–322. doi:10.1484/m.behe-eb.4.00192.
- Hutchinson, D. S. (1997). "Introduction to Halcyon". In John M. Cooper (ed.). Plato: Complete Works. Hackett Publishing.
- Irwin, T. H. (2019). "The Platonic Corpus". In Gail Fine (ed.). The Oxford Handbook of Plato (2nd ed.). Oxford University Press. pp. 68–91.
- Jażdżewska, Katarzyna (2022). Greek Dialogue in Antiquity: Post-Platonic Transformations. Oxford University Press.
- Joosse, Albert (2023). "Anonymizing Agents of Change in Philosophical Pseudepigraphy: The Case of Pseudo-Plato, De virtute". In Silvia Castelli; Ineke Sluiter (eds.). Agents of Change in the Greco-Roman and Early Modern Periods: Ten Case Studies in Agency in Innovation. Brill. pp. 111–128. doi:10.1163/9789004680012_007. ISBN 978-90-04-68001-2.
- Joyal, Mark (2014). "'Genuine' and 'Bastard' Dialogues in the Platonic Corpus: An Inquiry into the Origins and Meaning of a Concept". In Javier Martínez (ed.). Fakes and Forgers of Classical Literature: Ergo decipiatur!. Brill. pp. 73–93.
- Joyal, Mark (2019). "What Is Socratic about the Pseudo-Platonica?". In Christopher Moore (ed.). Brill's Companion to the Reception of Socrates. Brill. pp. 211–236.
- Massimo, Davide (2020). "Defining a 'Pseudo–Plato' Epigrammatist". In Roberta Berardi; Martina Filosa; Davide Massimo (eds.). Defining Authorship, Debating Authenticity: Problems of Authority from Classical Antiquity to the Renaissance. De Gruyter. pp. 47–66.
- Müller, C. W. (1975). Die Kurzdialoge der Appendix Platonica: Philologische Beiträge zur nach-platonischen Sokratik. Fink.
- Pietruschka, Ute (2014). "Gnomologia: Syriac and Arabic Traditions". In Houari Touati (ed.). Encyclopedia of Mediterranean Humanism.
- Pietruschka, Ute (2019). "Syriac Reception of Socrates". In Christopher Moore (ed.). Brill's Companion to the Reception of Socrates. Brill. pp. 518–544.
- Raggetti, Lucia (2023). "Hallucinations and Smoke Screens: The Pseudo-Platonic 'Laws of Nature' (Nawāmīs) and Their Transmission". Quaderni di Studi Arabi. 18 (1–2): 354–395.
- Rispoli, Gioia Maria (2000). "Pseudepigrafi platonici e filologia filosofica". In G. Cerri (ed.). La letteratura pseudepigrafa nella cultura greca e romana. Istituto Universitario Orientale. pp. 453–511.
- Rodríguez Adrados, Francisco (2009). Greek Wisdom Literature and the Middle Ages: The Lost Greek Models and Their Arabic and Castilian Translations. Translated by Joyce Greer. Peter Lang.
- Smith, Nicholas D. (1998). "General Introduction". In Nicholas D. Smith (ed.). Plato: Critical Assessments. Vol. I: General Issues of Interpretation. Routledge. pp. xi–xvii.
- Stanzel, Karl-Heinz (1987). Dicta Platonica: Die unter Platons Namen überlieferten Aussprüche (PhD diss.). University of Würzburg.
- Zonta, Mauro (2015). "Iwānnīs of Dārā On Soul's Virtues: About a Late Antiquity Greek Philosophical Work among Syrians and Arabs" (PDF). Studia graeco-arabica. 5: 129–143.
