= Aeschines of Sphettus =

4th century BC Greek philosopher

Aeschines of Sphettus (Ancient Greek: Αἰσχίνης Σφήττιος, c. 425 BC – c. 350 BC) or Aeschines Socraticus (Ancient Greek: Αἰσχίνης Σωκρατικός), son of Lysanias, of the deme Sphettus of Athens, was a philosopher who in his youth was a follower of Socrates. Historians call him Aeschines Socraticus—"the Socratic Aeschines"—to distinguish him from the more historically influential Athenian orator also named Aeschines. His name is sometimes but now rarely written as Aischines or Æschines.

== Aeschines and Socrates ==
According to Plato, Aeschines of Sphettus was present at the trial and execution of Socrates. We know that after Socrates' death, Aeschines went on to write philosophical dialogues, just as Plato did, in which Socrates was main speaker. Though Aeschines' dialogues have survived only as fragments and quotations by later writers, he was renowned in antiquity for his accurate portrayal of Socratic conversations. According to John Burnet, Aeschines' style of presenting Socratic dialogue was closer to Plato's than Xenophon's. (Some modern scholars believe that Xenophon's writings are inspired almost entirely by Plato's and/or by the influence of other Socratics such as Antisthenes and Hermogenes. On the other hand, there is no good reason to think that Aeschines' writings were not based almost entirely on his own personal recollections of Socrates.)

== Socratic dialogues ==
According to Diogenes Laërtius, Aeschines wrote seven Socratic dialogues:

- Alcibiades (not to be confused with either Platonic dialogue of the same name)
- Aspasia
- Axiochus (not to be confused with the dialogue of the same name erroneously included in the Platonic corpus)
- Callias
- Miltiades
- Rhinon
- Telauges

Of these, we have the most information about the Alcibiades and the Aspasia, and only a little about the others. The Suda, a Byzantine encyclopedia compiled a dozen centuries later, ascribes to Aeschines several other works called "headless" or "Prefaceless" (akephaloi): Phaidon, Polyainos, Drakon, Eryxias, On Excellence, The Erasistratoi, and The Skythikoi. Few modern scholars believe these other works were written by Aeschines.

The 2nd century AD sophist Publius Aelius Aristides quotes from the Alcibiades at length, preserving for us the largest surviving chunk of Aeschines' written work. Just before World War I, Arthur Hunt recovered from Oxyrhynchus a papyrus (#1608) containing a long, fragmentary passage from this dialogue that had been lost since ancient times. In the dialogue, Socrates converses with a young, ambitious Alcibiades about Themistocles and argues that Alcibiades is unprepared for a career in politics since he has failed to "care for himself" in such a way as to avoid thinking that he knows more than what he actually knows on matters of the most importance. Socrates seems to argue for the view that success is directly proportional to knowledge (though knowledge may not be sufficient for complete success), as opposed to being dependent merely on fortune or divine dispensation, independent of knowledge. Socrates' arguments cause the usually cocky Alcibiades to weep in shame and despair—a result also attested to by Plato in the Symposium. Socrates claims that it is only through loving Alcibiades that he can improve him (by cultivating in him a desire to pursue knowledge?), since Socrates has no knowledge of his own to teach.

Our major sources for the Aspasia are Athenaeus, Plutarch, and Cicero. In the dialogue, Socrates recommends that Callias send his son Hipponicus to Aspasia to learn politics. In the dialogue, Socrates argues, among other things, that women are capable of exactly the same military and political "virtues" as are men, which Socrates proves by referring Callias to the examples of Aspasia herself (who famously advised Pericles), Thargelia of Miletus (a courtesan who supposedly persuaded many Greeks to ally themselves with Xerxes who in turn gave Thargelia part of Thessaly to rule), and the legendary Persian warrior-queen Rhodogyne. (The doctrine is likewise found in Plato's Meno and Republic, and so is confirmed as genuinely Socratic.) A certain Xenophon is also mentioned in the dialogue—Socrates says that Aspasia exhorted this Xenophon and his wife to cultivate knowledge of self as a means to virtue—but this Xenophon may not be the same Xenophon who is more familiar to us as a historian and another author of Socratic memoirs.

In the Telauges, Socrates converses with the Pythagorean ascetic Telauges (a companion of Hermogenes who was Callias' half-brother and a follower of Socrates) and Crito's young son Critobulus. In the dialogue, Socrates criticizes Telauges for his extreme asceticism and Critobulus for his ostentatiousness, apparently in an attempt to argue for a moderate position.

The Axiochus—named after Axiochus, the uncle of Alcibiades—criticized Alcibiades for being a drunkard and a womanizer. Evidently, it was, like the Alcibiades, one of the many works that the Socratics published to clear Socrates of any blame for Alcibiades' corruption.

In the Callias, there is a discussion of the "correct use" of wealth; it is argued that how one holds up under poverty is a better measure of virtue than how well one makes use of wealth. In the dialogue, Prodicus is criticized for having taught Theramenes.

The setting of the Miltiades is the stoa of Zeus Eleutherios. The dialogue is between Socrates, Euripides, Hagnon (stepfather of Theramenes), and Miltiades son of Stesagoras. This Miltiades is not to be confused with Miltiades the Younger, but is probably a close relative of his. The dialogue contains an encomium to Miltiades for having had an exemplary training and education in his youth, perhaps in contrast to the kind of education offered by sophists like Protagoras.

== Anecdotes ==
Diogenes Laërtius, in his brief Life of Aeschines, reports that Aeschines, having fallen into dire financial straits, went to the court of Dionysius the Younger in Syracuse and then returned to Athens after Dionysius was deposed by Dion. (If this is true, Aeschines must have lived at least until 356, which would mean that he probably died of old age in Athens, as he was likely not less than 18 at the time of Socrates' trial in 399.) He is also said to have practised rhetoric, writing speeches for litigants.

Athenaeus quotes a passage from a lost prosecution speech, ghosted by Lysias, Against Aeschines, in which Aeschines' adversary chastises him for incurring a debt while working as a perfume vendor and not paying it back, a turn of events that is surprising—the speaker alleges—given that Aeschines was a student of Socrates and that both of them spoke so much of virtue and justice. Among other charges, Aeschines is basically characterized as a sophist in the speech. (We gather that the litigation in question was one brought by Aeschines himself against his lender for reasons that are not made clear in Athenaeus' quotation.)

Diogenes Laërtius claims that, contrary to Plato's Crito, it was Aeschines rather than Crito who urged Socrates after his trial to flee Athens rather than face his sentence; Diogenes says that Plato puts the arguments into Crito's mouth because Plato disliked Aeschines due to his association with Aristippus. But Diogenes' source for this is Idomeneus of Lampsacus, a notorious scandalmonger.

From Hegesander of Delphi (2nd century CE)—via Athenaeus—we hear of the scandal that Plato stole away Aeschines' only student Xenocrates. But Hegesander is notoriously unreliable, and the story is entirely uncorroborated. There is no other evidence of Aeschines' having a "philosophy" of his own to teach or any followers of his own.

== Scholarship ==
The extant fragments and quotations concerning Aeschines were collected by the German scholar Heinrich Dittmar. That collection has been superseded by the Italian scholar Gabriele Giannantoni's work on Socratic writings. English translations are hard to find. G. C. Field has a translation of some of the Alcibiades fragments, paraphrases the other Alcibiades fragments, and a translation of Cicero's excerpt of Aspasia. More recently, David Johnson has published a translation of all the extant passages from the Alcibiades.

Charles H. Kahn provides a good, up-to-date account of Aeschines' writings, with many references to current secondary literature on the topic. Kahn believes that Aeschines' writings, and in general all Socratic dialogues of the time, constitute literature and cannot be an ultimately reliable source of historical information.

Kahn's treatment might profitably be contrasted with A.E. Taylor's position that both Plato and Aeschines preserve a faithful historical legacy in their portrayals of Socrates.
