= Cydathenaeum =

Deme in ancient Athens

Coordinates: 37°58′26″N 23°43′50″E

Cydathenaeum or Kydathenaion (Greek: Κυδαθήναιον) was one of the demes in ancient Athens. It belonged in the phyle (tribe) Pandionis.

== History ==
When Cleisthenes formally established the deme system in 508/7 BC, Kydathenaion was the third largest deme after Acharnae and Aphidna. Its population is estimated to have been around 3,300–3,600 people. Kydathenaion was one of the five demes located within the walls of the city of Athens (alongside Koile, Kollytos, Melite, and Skambonidai). It was in the very heart of Athens containing the Acropolis, and possibly the Areopagus.

Notable people from the deme include:

- Cleon (died 422 BC), statesman and a general during the Peloponnesian War
- Andocides (440–390 BC), one of the ten Attic orators
- Aristophanes (c. 446 – c. 386 BC), comic playwright
- Nicochares (died c. 345 BC), comic poet
- Echedemos (fl. 190 BC), statesman, ambassador
- Aristodemus of Cydathenaeum
