= Antiphon (brother of Plato) =

Half brother of Plato

Antiphon (Ancient Greek: Ἀντιφῶν) was a man of ancient Greece who was the youngest brother of the philosopher Plato. Born between 423 BCE and 413 BCE to Plato's mother Perictione and her second husband, Pyrilampes, he is referenced in the dialogue Parmenides, in which he is said to have given up philosophy to devote most of his time to horses.
