= Plato's theory of soul =

Philosophical theory

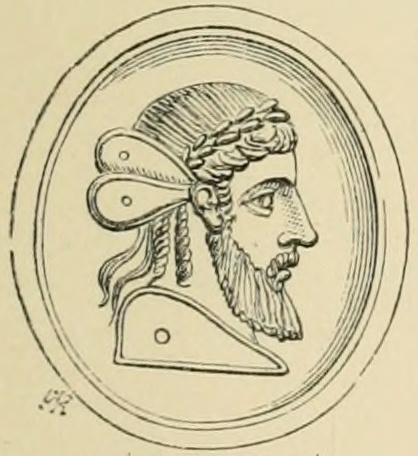
Likeness of Plato after an engraved gem. The Psyche-wings fastened to his temples allude to his doctrine of the immortality of the soul.

Plato's theory of the soul, which was inspired variously by the teachings of Socrates, considered the psyche (Ancient Greek: ψῡχή, romanized: psūkhḗ) to be the essence of a person, being that which decides how people behave. Plato considered this essence to be an incorporeal, eternal occupant of a person's being. Plato said that even after death, the soul exists and is able to think. He believed that as bodies die, the soul is continually reborn (metempsychosis) in subsequent bodies. Plato divided the soul into three parts: the logistikon (reason), the thymoeides (spirit, which houses anger, as well as other spirited emotions), and the epithymetikon (appetite or desire, which houses the desire for physical pleasures).

== The tripartite soul ==
The Platonic soul consists of three parts, which are located in different regions of the body:

1. The logos (λογιστικόν), or logistikon, located in the head, is related to reason and regulates the other parts.
2. The thymos (θυμοειδές), or thumoeides, located near the chest region, is related to spirit.
3. The eros (ἐπιθυμητικόν), or epithumetikon, located in the stomach, is related to one's desires.

In his treatise The Republic, and also with the chariot allegory in Phaedrus, Plato asserted that the three parts of the psyche also correspond to the three classes of society (viz. the rulers, the military, and the ordinary citizens). The function of the epithymetikon is to produce and seek pleasure. The function of the logistikon is to rule through the love of learning gently. The function of the thymoeides is to obey the directions of the logistikon while ferociously defending the whole from external invasion and internal disorder.

Whether in a city or an individual, justice (δικαιοσύνη, dikaiosyne) is declared to be the state of the whole in which each part fulfills its function, while temperance is the state of the whole where each part does not attempt to interfere in the functions of the others. Injustice (ἀδικία, adikia) is the contrary state of the whole, often taking the specific form in which the spirited are obedient to the appetitive while they together either ignore the logical entirely or employ it in their pursuits of pleasure.

== In the Republic ==
In Book IV, part 4 of the Republic, Socrates and his interlocutors (Glaucon and Adeimantus) are attempting to answer whether the soul is one or made of parts. Socrates states: "It is obvious that the same thing will never do or suffer opposites in the same respect in relation to the same thing and at the same time. So that if ever we find these contradictions in the functions of the mind we shall know that it was not the same thing functioning but a plurality." (This is an example of Plato's principle of non-contradiction).

For instance, it seems that, given each person has only one soul, it should be impossible for a person to simultaneously desire something yet also at that very moment be averse to the same thing, as when one is tempted to commit a crime but also averse to it. Both Socrates and Glaucon agree that it should not be possible for the soul to be at the same time both in one state and its opposite. From this, it follows that there must be at least two aspects to the soul. Having named these as "reason" and "appetite", Plato goes on to identify a third aspect, "spirit", which in a healthy psyche ought to be aligned with reason.

=== Reason (λογιστικόν) ===
The logical or logistikon (from logos) is the thinking part of the soul, which loves the truth and seeks to learn it. Plato originally identifies the soul dominated by this part with the Athenian temperament.

Plato makes the point that the logistikon would be the smallest part of the soul (as the rulers would be the smallest population within the Republic), but that, nevertheless, a soul can be declared just only if all three parts agree that the logistikon should rule.

=== Spirit (θυμοειδές) ===
According to Plato, the spirited or thymoeides (from thymos) is part of the soul by which we are angry or get into a temper. He also calls this part 'high spirit' and initially identifies the soul dominated by this part with the Thracians, Scythians, and the people of "northern regions".

=== Appetite (ἐπιθυμητικόν) ===
The appetite or epithymetikon (from epithymia, translated to Latin as concupiscentia or desiderium).

== Reincarnation ==
Plato's theory of the reincarnation of the soul combined the ideas of Socrates and Pythagoras, mixing the divine privileges of men with the path of reincarnation between different animal species. He believed the human prize for the virtuous or the punishment for the guilty were not placed in different parts of the underworld but directly on Earth. After death, a guilty soul would be re-embodied first in a woman (in accordance with Plato's belief that women occupied a lower level of the natural scale), and then in an animal species, descending from quadrupeds down to snakes and fish. According to this theory, women and the lower animals were created only in order to provide a habitat for degraded souls.

Plato, most of the time, says that there is a distinct reward-and-punishment phase of the afterlife between reincarnations. Only in the Timaeus and Laws does the reward-and-punishment phase disappear; in these two texts, the punishment is said to be the reincarnation itself.

== See also ==
- Tripartite (theology)
- Sigmund Freud's concepts of the id, ego and superego
