= Perictione =

Mother of Plato

Perictione /ˌpɛrɪkˈtaɪəˌniː/ (Ancient Greek: Περικτιόνη Periktiónē; c. 450-365 BCE) was the mother of the Greek philosopher Plato.

She was a descendant of Solon, the Athenian lawgiver. Her illustrious family goes back to Dropides, archon of the year 644 b.c. She was married to Ariston, and had three sons (Glaucon, Adeimantus, and Plato) and a daughter (Potone). After Ariston's death, she remarried Pyrilampes, an Athenian statesman and her uncle. She had her fifth child, Antiphon, with Pyrilampes. Antiphon appears in Plato's Parmenides.

Two spurious works attributed to Perictione have survived in fragments, On the Harmony of Women and On Wisdom. The works do not date from the same time and are usually assigned to a Perictione I and a Perictione II. The dating and difference in the dialect of Greek used mean they could not have been written by this Perictione but instead by two other, unknown women named Perictione. Both works are pseudonymous Pythagorean literature. On the Harmony of Women, concerns the duties of a woman to her husband, her marriage, and to her parents; it is written in Ionic Greek and probably dates to the late 4th or 3rd century BC. On Wisdom offers a philosophical definition of wisdom; it is written in Doric Greek and probably dates to the 3rd or 2nd century BC.
