= Orthotes onomaton =

Platonic theory on words and names

Orthotes onomaton (Ancient Greek: ὀρθότης ὀνομάτων, "correctness of names") is a Platonic theory that investigates the correct usage of words and names.

== Overview ==
The most common texts orthotes onomaton appears in are Plato's works Cratylus, Protagoras, and The Republic. In these, he criticizes the Sophists, namely Prodicus and Protagoras, for their misused language.

Plato, Prodicus, and Protagoras stemmed from the same literary history of Ancient Greece; therefore, this issue of who is saying what correctly is innovative for the point in time that these texts were created. Plato's concern with the sophists' usage was that their words and phrases gave misleading impressions about reality and that, as highly revered intellectuals, the sophists should have utilized the most fitting descriptive words possible. He depicts these two in different lights.

Prodicus’ concern with orthotēs onomatōn appears to be a problem with correctness, with terms that are very similar in meaning and relation but have different senses. “In Protagoras, for example, Prodicus is said to distinguish between the terms “impartial” and “undecided”; “debate” and “dispute”; “esteem” and “praise”; “enjoyment” and “pleasure”; and “will” and “desire”.

Plato depicts Protagoras as using distinctions between grander meanings and word genders. “Protagoras is alleged to have faulted Homer for opening the Iliad with a command when the poet thought he was uttering a prayer.”

== See also ==
- Rectification of names
