= Clitophon =

Clitophon, or the alternate transliteration Cleitophon, may refer to:

- Clitophon (Athenian), 5th-century BCE Athenian oligarch
- Clitophon (dialogue), a dialogue attributed to Plato
- Clitophon of Rhodes, ancient Greek writer to whom the story of Lilaeus is attributed

== See also ==
- Leucippe and Clitophon, by Achilles Tatius, one of the five surviving Ancient Greek romances
