= Acumenus =

5th-century BC Greek physician

Acumenus (Ancient Greek: Ἀκουμενός) was a physician of Athens who lived in the 5th century BC. He was mentioned as the friend and companion of Socrates. He was the father of Eryximachus, who was also a physician, and who is introduced as one of the speakers in Plato's Symposium. He is also mentioned in the collection of letters first published by Leo Allatius in 1637 (Epist. Socralis et Socraticorum), and again by Orellius in 1815.

Both Acumenus and Eryximachus were implicated in accusations of sacrilege in 415. After being named by the slave Lydus as having profaned the Eleusinian Mysteries, Acumenus fled Athens.
