= Agyrrhius =

4th-century BC Greek politician

Agyrrhius/Agyrrhios (Ancient Greek: Ἀγύρριος) of the deme Collytus in Attica, was an Athenian politician in the final years of the 5th and early years of the 4th century BCE. His best-known accomplishment was the establishment of pay for attendance at meetings of the Ekklesia (Assembly), in reward for which (apparently) he was elected general in 390/89. He was also named as one of the proposers of a decree to reduce payments to the comic poets. Harpokration gave him credit for establishing the theorika (festival fund) so the poor could attend theater performances, but this attribution is contested by some scholars.

His reputation was mixed. The orator Andokides accused him in 399 of conspiring to rig the bidding on tax collection contracts in 401 and 400 in order to defraud the city of its normal revenues. In response Agyrrhios joined several others in indicting Andokides for impiety - a charge which Andokides successfully refuted in court. According to the orator Demosthenes, Agyrrhios later spent many years in jail "until he had repaid the money in his possession which was adjudged to be public property".

Aristophanes lampooned Agyrrhios in two plays:

Ekklesiazusai (Women of the Assembly):

Even a woman-looking man, like Agyrrhios looks like a man-looking woman, now that he's wearing Pronomous' beard! Agyrrhios, ey? Remember him! That crooked, filthy rich politician! Agyrrhios! Rules the whole city, the bastard! It's because of him that we should try and accomplish this daring deed today, girls. (100 ff.)

Ploutos (Wealth), referring to Agyrrhios' frequent harangues in the Ekklesia where he proposed policies that would benefit him financially:

Doesn't Agyrrhios fart because of it? (190)
