= Axiochus =

Late 5th-century BC Athenian politician

Axiochus of Scambonidae, son of Alcibiades (II) (Greek: Ἀξίοχος Ἀλκιβιάδου Σκαμβωνίδης, Axíochos Alkibiádou Skambōnídēs; mid-5th century – late 5th century BCE), was an ancient Athenian political figure and aristocrat of the Alcmaeonidae family. He was the uncle and cohort of the famous general and statesman Alcibiades (III), whom he accompanied in domestic and foreign affairs. This association led to his recurrence within ancient literature, including works attributed to Plato and Lysias.

== Life ==
The son of the famous Alcibiades' grandfather, brother of Cleinias, and perhaps the nephew of Aspasia, Axiochus' lineage placed him within the elite and controversial Athenian family known as the Alcmaeonidae. Both the historical record and Lysias' apocryphal "Funeral Oration" speech imply Axiochus' close association with Alcibiades. Axiochus had a son, Cleinias (III).

As reported by Andocides and attested to within the archaeological record, Axiochus was indicted in 415 BCE along with Alcibiades in the profanation of the Eleusinian Mysteries, a point of major domestic turmoil within the Peloponnesian War that preceded the calamitous Sicilian Expedition. This led Axiochus to flee Athens, causing him to lose his property and wealth in the process. Like Alcibiades, he seems to have returned to Athens sometime between 411 and 407. He participated in the defense of the generals from the Battle of Arginusae in 406, which marks his final attribution in the historical record.

== In literature ==
Several ancient authors included Axiochus in their work, and his character is represented as scandalous and excessive. In his eponymous dialogue, Aeschines of Sphettus lambastes Axiochus' carousal with Alcibiades; the speech attributed to Lysias (the contents of which are presumed by scholars to be fictional) describes a case of incestuous debauchery with his famous nephew through their co-marriages with both Medontis of Abydus and the daughter that resulted. The apocryphal Platonic dialogue that bears his name depicts his loss of self-confidence while grappling with mortality on his deathbed. Plato's Euthydemus presents prominently Axiochus' son Cleinias as a budding student of Socrates, engaging dialectic against the sophists Euthydemus and Dionysodorus.

== See also ==
- List of speakers in Plato's dialogues
