= Collytus =

Deme of ancient Attica

Coordinates: 37°58′01″N 23°43′34″E

Collytus or Kollytos (Ancient Greek: Κολλυτός) was a deme of ancient Attica, located in the city of Athens. It was located within the walls of Themistocles, south of the Areopagus and southwest of Acropolis. It was famed due to its association with Plato, whose family was from this deme.

== Etymology ==
According to legend the name of the deme comes from Collytus, the father of Diomus, the favourite of Heracles and eponym of the deme Diomeia. For this reason it was believed that Collytus's deme was part of Melite.

== Description ==
Collytus was one of the richest demoi in the city of Athens and there were many aristocratic residences; the Peisistratids owned a house from which they often governed the city.

The rural Dionysias (festival of Dionysus) took place there, which shows that the deme was also an important agricultural center. Aeschines recited in the theater of Dionysus in the deme, and was so embarrassed of his role that he renounced the theater and gave himself to politics.

In the narrow main street of the deme there was a very popular market.

== People ==
- Adeimantus of Collytus (c. 432–382 BCE), Plato's brother
- Ariston of Athens (d. 424 BCE), Plato's father
- Aristophon of Colyttus (fl. 4th century BCE), orator
- Agyrrhius (fl. 4th century BCE), general
- Glaucon, Plato's brother
- Hypereides (c. 390–322 BCE), politician and speechwriter
- Potone, Plato's sister
