= Pausanias of Athens =

5th-century BC Athenian

Pausanias (/pɔːˈseɪniəs/; Ancient Greek: Παυσανίας; fl. c. 420 BC) was an ancient Athenian of the deme Kerameis, who was the lover of the poet Agathon.

Although Pausanias is given a significant speaking part in Plato's Symposium, very little is known about him. Ancient anecdotes tend to address only his relationship with Agathon and give us no information about his personal accomplishments. Around 407 BC he removed himself together with Agathon from Athens to the court of the Macedonian king Archelaus.

Pausanias appears briefly in two other Socratic dialogues, Plato's Protagoras and Xenophon's Symposium. He is also mentioned in Book V of Athenaeus' Deipnosophistae, and in Book II of Claudius Aelianus' Varia Historia.

== See also ==
- List of speakers in Plato's dialogues
