= Ionidae =

Coordinates: 38°01′43″N 23°54′52″E

Ionidae or Ionidai (Ancient Greek: Ἰωνίδαι) was a deme (suburb) in ancient Attica, of the phyle of Aegeis, sending two delegates to the Athenian Boule.

This deme, along with that of Cydantidae, venerated the kolokratai; these two demoi are the only known ones to venerate deities together.

Its site is tentatively located near Draphi.
