= Prodicus =

Greek philosopher (c. 465 – c. 395 BC)

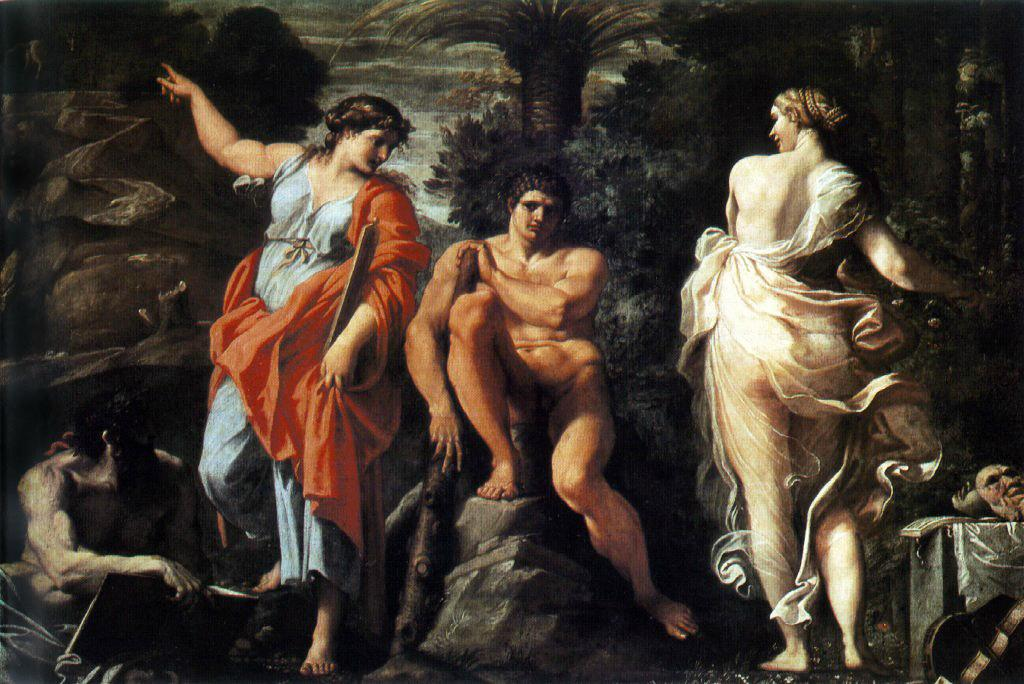
The Choice of Hercules, by Annibale Carracci, depicting the fable recounted by Prodicus

Prodicus of Ceos (/ˈproʊdɪkəs/; Ancient Greek: Πρόδικος ὁ Κεῖος, Pródikos ho Keios; c. 465 BC – c. 395 BC) was a Greek philosopher, and part of the first generation of Sophists. He came to Athens as ambassador from Ceos, and became known as a speaker and a teacher. Plato treats him with greater respect than the other sophists, and in several of the Platonic dialogues Socrates appears as the friend of Prodicus. One writer claims Socrates used his method of instruction. Prodicus made linguistics and ethics prominent in his curriculum. The content of one of his speeches is still known, and concerns a fable in which Heracles has to make a choice between Virtue and Vice. He also interpreted religion through the framework of naturalism.

== Life ==
Prodicus was a native of Ioulis on the island of Ceos, the birthplace of Simonides, whom he is described as having imitated. Prodicus came frequently to Athens for the purpose of transacting business on behalf of his native city, and attracted admiration as an orator, although his voice was deep and apt to fall. Plutarch describes him as slender and weak; and Plato also alludes to his weakness, and a degree of effeminacy which thus resulted. Philostratus accuses him of luxury and avarice, but no earlier source mentions this.

In the Protagoras of Plato, (dramatic date c. 430 BC), Prodicus is mentioned as having previously arrived in Athens. He appears in a play of Eupolis, and in The Clouds (423 BC) and The Birds (414 BC) of Aristophanes. He came frequently to Athens on public business. His pupils included the orators Theramenes and Isocrates, and in the year of the death of Socrates (399 BC), Prodicus was still living. According to the statement of Philostratus, on which little reliance can be placed, he delivered his lecture on virtue and vice in Thebes and Sparta also. The Apology of Plato unites him with Gorgias and Hippias as among those who were considered competent to instruct the youth in any city. Lucian mentions him among those who held lectures at Olympia.

In the dialogues of Plato he is mentioned or introduced with a certain degree of esteem, compared with the other sophists. In Meno, Socrates refers to him as his teacher. Aristophanes, in The Clouds, deals more indulgently with him than with Socrates; and Xenophon's Socrates, for the purpose of combating the voluptuousness of Aristippus, borrows from the book of "the wise Prodicus" the story of the choice of Hercules. Like Protagoras and others, Prodicus delivered lectures in return for payment of from half a drachma to 50 drachmae, probably according to whether the hearers limited themselves to a single lecture or a more complete course. Prodicus is said to have amassed a great amount of money. The assertion that he hunted after rich young men is only found in Philostratus.

== Teachings ==
Prodicus was part of the first generation of Sophists. "He was a Sophist in the full sense of a professional freelance educator." As he taught both philosophy and politics, so Plato represents his instructions as chiefly ethical, and gives preference to his distinction of ideas, such as courage, rashness, boldness, over similar attempts of other sophists. He sometimes gave individual show-orations, and though known to Callimachus, they do not appear to have been long preserved. In contrast with Gorgias and others, who boasted of possessing the art of making the small appear great, the great small, and of expatiating in long or short speeches, Prodicus required that the speech should be neither long nor short, but of the proper measure, and it is only as associated with other sophists that he is charged with endeavouring to make the weaker cause appear strong by means of his rhetoric (thereby inspiring, e.g., Milton's description of Belial).

=== Linguistics ===
Several of Plato's dialogues focus upon Prodicus's linguistic theory, and his insistence upon the correct use of names. He paid special attention to the correct use of words, and the distinction of expressions related in sense. In Meno, Plato has Socrates observe that Prodicus might more tightly distinguish certain words which Socrates was happy to treat as sharing broadly the same meaning. Thucydides is said to have gained from him his accuracy in the use of words. In the Cratylus, Socrates jokes that if he could have afforded the fifty drachma lectures he would now be an expert on "the correctness of names". In several of the Platonic dialogues Socrates appears as the friend and companion of Prodicus, which reveals at least that the two did have close personal relations, and that Socrates did attend at least a few of his lectures. "For Socrates, correct language was the prerequisite for correct living (including an efficient government). But Prodicus, though his linguistic teaching undoubtedly included semantic distinctions between ethical terms, had stopped at the threshold. The complete art of logoi embraced nothing less than the whole of philosophy."

=== Ethics ===
The speech on the choice of Hercules was entitled Horai (Ancient Greek: Ὧραι). Hercules, as he was entering manhood, had to choose one of the two paths of life, that of virtue and that of vice. There appeared two women, the one of dignified beauty, adorned with purity, modesty, and discretion, the other of a voluptuous form, and meretricious look and dress. The latter promises to lead him by the shortest road, without any toil, to the enjoyment of every pleasure. The other, while she reminds him of his progenitors and his noble nature, does not conceal from him that the gods have not granted what is really beautiful and good apart from trouble and careful striving. While one seeks to deter him from the path of virtue by urging the difficulty of it; the other calls attention to the unnatural character of enjoyment which anticipates the need of it, its want of the highest joy, that arising from noble deeds, and the consequences of a life of voluptuousness, and how she herself, honoured by gods and men, leads to all noble works, and to true well-being in all circumstances of life. Hercules decides for virtue. This outline in Xenophon probably represents, in a very abbreviated form, the leading ideas of the original, of which no fragments remain.

Another speech, apparently by Prodicus, is mentioned in the spurious Platonic dialogue Eryxias. Prodicus undertakes to show that the value of external goods depends simply upon the use which is made of them, and that virtue must be learnt. Similar sentiments were expressed in Prodicus's Praise of Agriculture. The spurious dialogue Axiochus attributes to him views respecting the worthlessness of earthly life in different ages and callings, and how we must long after freedom from connection with the body in the heavenly and cognate aether. Also found here is a doctrine that death is not to be feared, as it affects neither the living nor the departed.

=== Naturalism ===
Prodicus, like some of his fellow Sophists, interpreted religion through the framework of naturalism. The gods he regarded as personifications of the sun, moon, rivers, fountains, and whatever else contributes to the comfort of our life, and he was sometimes charged with atheism. "His theory was that primitive man was so impressed with the gifts nature provided him for the furtherance of his life that he believed them to be the discovery of gods or themselves to embody the godhead. This theory was not only remarkable for its naturalism but for its discernment of a close connection between religion and agriculture."
