= Sisyphus (dialogue) =

Putative dialogue of Plato

The Sisyphus (/ˈsɪsɪfəs/; Greek: Σίσυφος) is purported to be one of the dialogues of Plato. The dialogue is extant and was included in the Stephanus edition published in Geneva in 1578. It is now generally acknowledged to be spurious. The work probably dates from the fourth century BCE, and the author was presumably a pupil of Plato.

== Synopsis ==
It is a dialogue between Socrates and Sisyphus of Pharsalus. Sisyphus believes that deliberation allows one to find the best course of action, but Socrates is puzzled by what deliberation is, and why it is supposed to be different from guesswork. By the end of the dialogue, it becomes clear that Sisyphus does not know what deliberation is. The dialogue seems to engage with an idea of good deliberation (euboulia) for which Isocrates was a noted exponent. The author uses the term dialegesthai in an un-Platonic fashion to refer, not to dialectic, but to what Plato considered eristic.

== Dating ==
Carl Werner Müller argues that the Sisyphus can be dated securely to the middle third of the fourth century BC, and, assuming that the reference to "Callistratus" is to Callistratus of Aphidnae, to the period between Callistratus' death sentence in 361 and his execution (by 350), when no one needed to ask "Who is Callistratus?" but Callistratus' constantly changing location in exile made "Where is Callistratus?" a real question. Francesco Aronadio also dates the work to Plato's lifetime and places it within the circle of the Academy. Schleiermacher had opined that the Sisyphus could perhaps have been produced in the Megarian school.

The dialogue is freely paraphrased in Dio Chrysostom's On Deliberation (oration 26), the earliest instance of a famous author making reference to a work of the Appendix Platonica (notheuomenoi).
