= Eryximachus =

5th-century BC Athenian physician

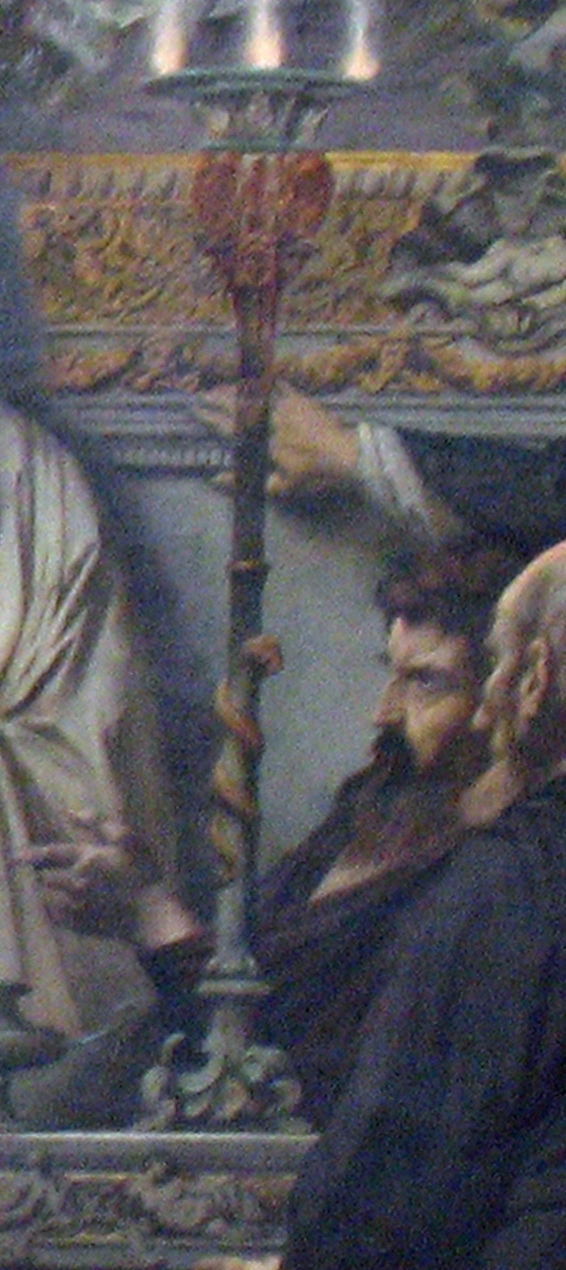
The figure (center) from Anselm Feuerbach's The Banquet (After Plato) interpreted as a depiction of Eryximachus.

Eryximachus, son of Acumenus (/ɪˈrɪksɪˌmækəs/; Greek: Ἐρυξίμαχος Ἀκουμένου Eruxímachos Akouménou; c. 448 – late 5th century or early 4th century BCE) was an ancient Athenian physician who is best remembered for his prominent role in Plato's Symposium. It is likely that he was indicted in the mutilation of the herms, a domestic Athenian conflict during the Peloponnesian War.

== Life ==
The son of the physician Acumenus, Eryximachus was born in the mid-5th century BC. Set approximately in 433/2, Plato's Protagoras dialogue includes a depiction of his close friendship with Socrates' student Phaedrus, a friendship that continued into the dramatic time of the Phaedrus dialogue some 15 years later. His wealth and social status are unclear from the extant sources.

An Eryximachus is mentioned in Andocides' On the Mysteries speech as among those indicted in the mutilation of the herms and profanation of the Eleusinian Mysteries, two tumultuous events on the eve of the ill-fated Sicilian Expedition in 415. While there is no clear confirmation that this Eryximachus is the physician, there are numerous pieces of circumstantial evidence, including Phaedrus' role and Eryximachus' appearance in Plato's Symposium alongside others involved in these incidents. It is unclear whether he was among those executed because of the event, but the historical record lacks later references to him.

== In Plato ==
While he is present silently in the Protagoras and receives mention in the Phaedrus, his most significant appearance in Plato's writing comes in the Symposium. Here he instigates and contributes to the event's extended discourse on the god Eros and the phenomena associated with this god. In his speech, he uses the language of his doctor's craft to describe love in bodily terms. While some have dismissed his Platonic character as arrogant, pedantic, and a figure of comedic fun, others have argued for his role as a serious contributor to the discourse, or even attributed traditional Platonic philosophical values to his medical arguments.

== See also ==
- List of speakers in Plato's dialogues
