= Theages =

Dialogue attributed to Plato

Theages (Greek: Θεάγης, also known as "On Wisdom: Obstetric" (H ΠΈΡΙ ΣΟΦΙΑΣ᾽ ΜΑΙΕΥΤΙΚΟΣ)) is a dialogue attributed to Plato, featuring Demodocus, Socrates and Theages. There is debate over its authenticity; W. R. M. Lamb draws this conclusion from his opinion that the work is inferior and un-Socratic, but acknowledges that it was universally regarded as authentic in antiquity.

== Background ==
In the dialogue, Demodocus introduces Socrates with his son Theages, who wishes to study "how to become wise". In this dialogue, Socrates makes mention of his daemon, the inner voice he also mentions in the Apology and other works by Plato.

Reference to Theages is made in Plato's Republic (496b): “there are some who are restrained by our friend Theages' bridle; for everything in the life of Theages conspired to divert him from philosophy”.

Theages 125e8–126a4 is quoted by Nietzsche in Will to Power §958: "In Plato's Theages it is written: 'Each one of us would like to be master over all men, if possible, and best of all God.' This attitude must exist again" (trans. Walter Kaufmann).

== Synopsis ==
Demodocus meets Socrates near the stoa of Zeus, and asks for his advice regarding his son, Theages, who desires "to become wise" (sophos), something that Demodocus considers dangerous. Socrates suggests that he should speak directly to Theages, who happens to be present, remarking how the boy has a "holy sounding" name (Theages, θεός+άγω, means “god-guided").

Socrates asks Theages what kind specialty is wisdom exactly, and the boy responds that it's the ability to govern men (123e). Socrates suggests to Theages that the art he is looking for is that of the despot, tyrant (τύραννος) in the original text (124e), a word that in Ancient Greek meant autocrat rather than violent oppressor as it does today. Socrates proceeds to tell Theages that this, like all other arts, are learned by associating with those who practice it, which in this case are despots. Theages adds that he does not wish to rule by force like some tyrants do, but by consent (126a), and Socrates, holding to his original position, suggests that someone like Pericles would be most appropriate. Theages however replies that he has actually heard Socrates say that even Pericles could not make his student virtuous (which was truly recorded in the Protagoras dialogue (320a-b)).

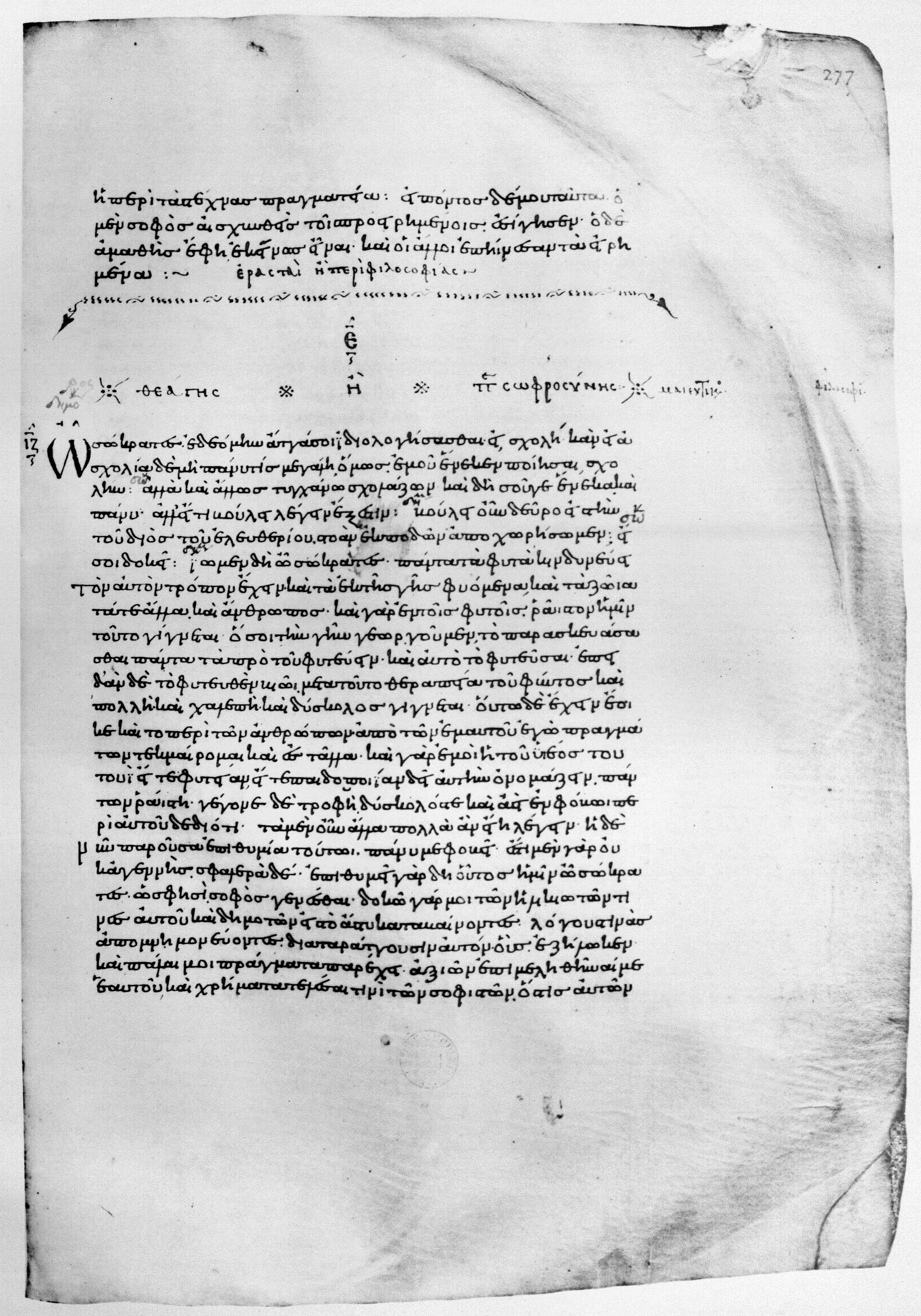
Page of the Codex Oxoniensis Clarkianus 39 (aka "the Clarke Plato") a 9th century CE Greek manuscript. Showing the beginning of the dialogue.

Finally Theages suggests that, as rumours will have it, Socrates himself might be the best of teachers, if he would have him as his student. Socrates begins by telling Theages of his daemon, a guiding spirit whose voice he's been hearing since childhood, always telling him what he should not do, rather than what he should. He continues by giving examples of "prophesies" he has made with the help of this spirit, and must therefore take his warning seriously. Theages suggests that he could start as Socrates' student, and if the daemon appears to disagree, they could terminate his tutelage, otherwise, continue. Socrates agrees.
