= Aristodemus of Cydathenaeum =

Ancient Greek follower of Socrates

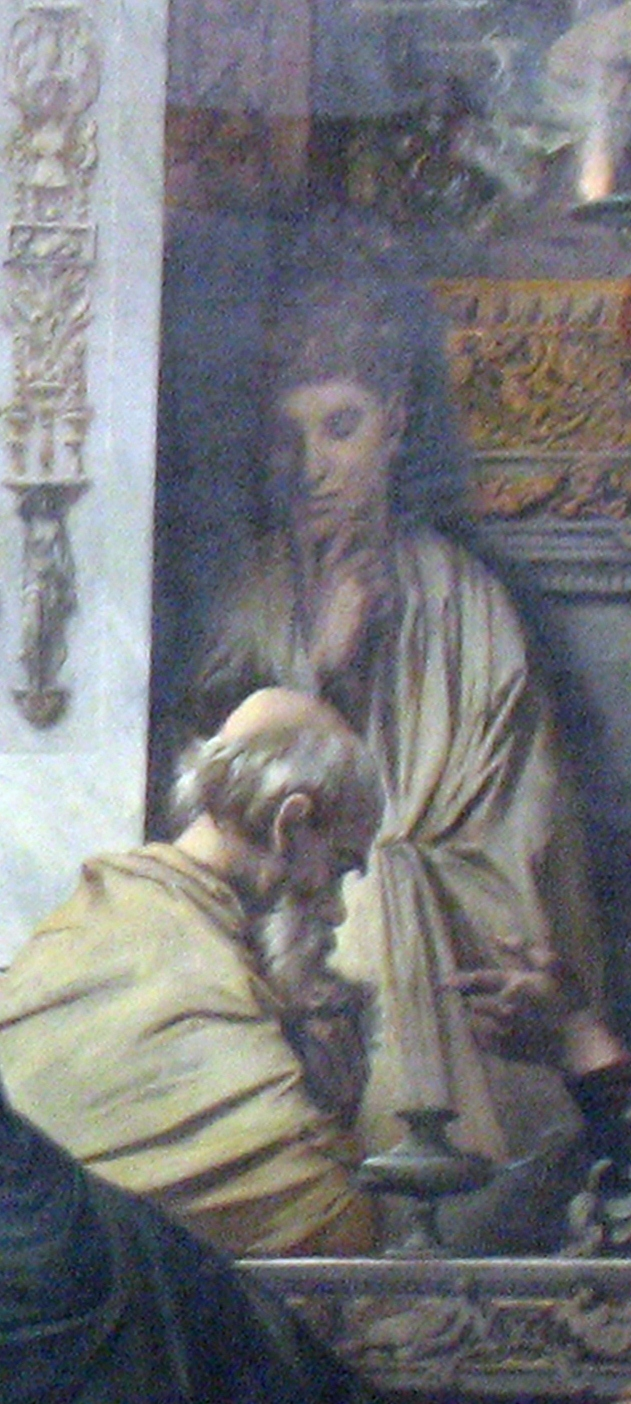
The figure (top) from Anselm Feuerbach's The Banquet (After Plato) interpreted as a depiction of Aristodemus.

Aristodemus of Cydathenaeum (Greek: Ἀριστόδημος Κυδαθηναιεύς Aristódēmos Kudathēnaieύs; fl. c. 5th century BCE) was an ancient Athenian follower of the philosopher Socrates. He is best remembered as a character and narrative source in Plato's Symposium, and is also preserved in Xenophon's Memorabilia and a fragment from Aristophanes.

== Life ==
Aristodemus is described as a barefooted runt of low birth in Plato's Symposium, while Xenophon refers to him as Aristodemus the dwarf ("Ἀριστόδημον τὸν μικρόν Aristódēmon tón mikrón"). He was a citizen of the same deme as that of the comedian Aristophanes, with whom he appears in the Symposium. Although little is known of his life, his depiction as a member of an earlier generation of Socratic followers places his birth in the early-mid 5th century BCE, a theory supported by his apparent inclusion in Aristophanes' comedy Banqueters of 427. Scholars assume that his death preceded the end of the 5th century, since he was not present during Socrates' final days in 399 despite being a devoted student.

== Thought and depiction in literature ==
His own philosophy is obscure. It is best preserved through his depiction in Xenophon as an admirer of artists who neither prays nor sacrifices due to what he perceives as the gods' lack of need, leading some commentators to accredit Aristodemus with a potential brand of Socratic proto-atheism. R.D.C. Robbins states that Aristodemus both despised the gods and ridiculed those who worshiped them.

Aristodemus' representation in Plato's Symposium has given rise to debate, as scholars have interpreted his character as hubristic, or instead humble and pathetic. Although the drinking party depicted in the Symposium involved each guest discoursing on the nature of Eros, Aristodemus' own speech was either passed over unreported or never given, perhaps due to his perceived insignificance.

Generally believed to be the follower of Socrates, the Aristodemus mentioned in the Banqueters is mocked for his sexual promiscuity.

== See also ==
- List of speakers in Plato's dialogues
