= Aristonymus of Athens =

Ancient Athenian philosopher

Aristonymus of Athens (Greek: Ἀριστώνυμος) was sent by Plato to reform the constitution of the Arcadians. Aristonymus was the father of Clitophon.

== Sources ==
- Plato, Republic, 328b
- Plutarch, Reply to Colotes, 1126c
