= G. C. Field =

British philosopher (1887–1955)

Field in 1949

Guy Cromwell Field FBA (15 January 1887 – 28 April 1955) was a British philosopher. He was Professor of Philosophy at the University of Bristol from 1926 to 1952 and the university's Pro-Vice-Chancellor from 1944 to 1945 and from 1947 to 1952. He was the grandson of Jesse Collings.

Field was born in Birmingham and educated at Marlborough College and at Balliol College, Oxford. He served as an officer in the Royal Warwickshire Regiment during World War I, was captured by German forces, and escaped. He married Agnes Doris Skinner in Holy Trinity Brompton, London, in December 1919.

Field was the general editor of two series of monographs on philosophy and psychology published by Methuen in the 1930s and 1940s. His own book Prejudice and Impartiality (1932) was among the first books in the first series.

During World War II, from 1940 to 1944, Field served on the tribunals that assessed applications from those of military age who wished to be formally accepted as conscientious objectors and therefore exempt from military service. In 1944, at the completion of these duties, he wrote a book, Pacifism and Conscientious Objection, based on his experiences. His book, he wrote, was an attempt to establish "the propositions that there are certain evils which are worse than war and that there are circumstances in which these can only be met by fighting".

== Works ==
Field published:

- Guild Socialism (1920)
- Moral Theory (1921)
- Plato and his Contemporaries (1930)
- Prejudice and Impartiality (1932)
- Studies in Philosophies (1935)
- Pacifism and Conscientious Objection (1945)
- The Philosophy of Plato (1949)
- Political Theory (1956)
