= Epigrams (Plato) =

At least two dozen epigrams have been attributed to Plato, mostly in the Greek Anthology. These are short poems suitable for dedicatory purposes written in the form of elegiac couplets. Their authenticity is disputed.

They include eight "love" or "amatory" epigrams (one commemorative, six erotic, and one funerary); dedicatory epigrams; sepulchral epigrams, and dedicatory or descriptive epigrams.

Typical of ancient Greek literature (and regardless of their Platonic authenticity), the epigrams refer to historical personalities, places in and around ancient Greece, and specific characters of Greek mythology.

== The epigrams ==
=== The Greek Anthology ===
==== Book V (Amatory Epigrams) ====
- My soul was on my lips as I was kissing Agathon. Poor soul! she came hoping to cross over to him.

τὴν ψυχήν, Ἀγάθωνα φιλῶν, ἐπὶ χείλεσιν ἔσχον

ἦλθε γὰρ ἡ τλήμων ὡς διαβησομένη.

Agathon, an Athenian tragic poet, appeared in Plato's Symposium. John Madison Cooper remarks that it is "odd to find Plato... speaking in erotic terms of Agathon and Phaedrus as desirable youths" as they were was two decades older than Plato. Greek Anthology, v, 78.

- I throw the apple at thee, and thou, if thou lovest me from thy heart, take it and give me of thy maidenhead; but if thy thoughts be what I pray they are not, take it still and reflect how short-lived is beauty.

τῷ μήλῳ βάλλω σε: σὺ δ᾽ εἰ μὲν ἑκοῦσα φιλεῖς με,

δεξαμένη, τῆς σῆς παρθενίης μετάδος:
εἰ δ᾽ ἄρ᾽ ὃ μὴ γίγνοιτο νοεῖς, τοῦτ᾽ αὐτὸ λαβοῦσα
σκέψαι τὴν ὥρην ὡς ὀλιγοχρόνιος.

The first "Apple" epigram. Apples were associated with Aphrodite: to throw an apple to someone was to declare one's love, and to catch and hold it was to show one's acceptance. Greek Anthology, v, 79.

- I am an apple; one who loves thee throws me at thee. But consent, Xanthippe; both thou and I decay.

μῆλον ἐγώ: βάλλει με φιλῶν σέ τις. ἀλλ᾽ ἐπίνευσον, Ξανθίππη: κἀγὼ καὶ σὺ μαραινόμεθα.
The second "Apple" epigram. The epigram may represent Socrates' courtship of his wife Xanthippe. It is unlikely that Plato would have addressed an epigram to Socrates' wife. Greek Anthology, v, 80.

==== Book VI (Dedicatory Epigrams) ====
- I, Laïs, whose haughty beauty made mock of Greece, I who once had a swarm of young lovers at my doors, dedicate my mirror to Aphrodite, since I wish not to look on myself as I am, and cannot look on myself as I once was.

ἡ σοβαρὸν γελάσασα καθ᾽ Ἑλλάδος, ἥ ποτ᾽ ἐραστῶν

ἑσμὸν ἐπὶ προθύροις Λαῒς ἔχουσα νέων,
τῇ Παφίῃ τὸ κάτοπτρον: ἐπεὶ τοίη μὲν ὁρᾶσθαι
οὐκ ἐθέλω, οἵη δ᾽ ἦν πάρος οὐ δύναμαι.

A reference to either of the courtesans Lais of Corinth or Lais of Hyccara, the two being historically confused in ancient literature, and therefore inextricably linked. Greek Anthology, vi, 1.

- Some traveller, who stilled here his tormenting thirst in the heat, moulded in bronze and dedicated ex voto this servant of the Nymphs, the damp songster who loves the rain, the frog who takes joy in light fountains; for it guided him to the water, as he wandered, singing opportunely with its amphibious mouth from the damp hollow. Then, not deserting the guiding voice, he found the drink he longed for.

τὸν Νυμφῶν θεράποντα, φιλόμβριον, ὑγρὸν ἀοιδόν,

τὸν λιβάσιν κούφαις τερπόμενον βάτραχον
χαλκῷ μορφώσας τις ὁδοιπόρος εὖχος ἔθηκε,
καύματος ἐχθροτάτην δίψαν ἀκεσσάμενος:
πλαζομένῳ γὰρ ἔδειξεν ὕδωρ, εὔκαιρον ἀείσας
κοιλάδος ἐκ δροσερῆς ἀμφιβίῳ στόματι.
φωνὴν δ᾽ ἡγήτειραν ὁδοιπόρος οὐκ ἀπολείπων
εὗρε πόσιν γλυκερῶν ὧν ἐπόθει ναμάτων.

Greek Anthology, vi, 43.

==== Book VII (Sepulchral Epigrams) ====
- Congenial to strangers and dear to his countrymen was this man, Pindar, the servant of the sweet-voiced Muses.

ἄρμενος ἦν ξείνοισιν ἀνὴρ ὅδε καὶ φίλος ἀστοῖς,

Πίνδαρος, εὐφώνων Πιερίδων: πρόπολος.

To Pindar, a lyric poet, whose association with the Muses is a compliment to his skill. Attributed in the Greek Anthology to Leonidas. Attributed to Plato by J. M. Edmonds. Greek Anthology, vii, 35.

- The Fates decreed tears for Hecuba and the Trojan women even at the hour of their birth; and after thou, Dio, hadst triumphed in the accomplishment of noble deeds, the gods spilt all thy far-reaching hopes. But thou liest in thy spacious city, honoured by thy countrymen, Dio, who didst madden my soul with love.

δάκρυα μὲν Ἑκάβῃ τε καὶ Ἰλιάδεσσι γυναιξὶ

Μοῖραι ἐπέκλωσαν δή ποτε γεινομέναις:
σοὶ δέ, Δίων, ῥέξαντι καλῶν ἐπινίκον ἔργων
δαίμονες εὐρείας ἐλπίδας ἐξέχεαν:
κεῖσαι δ᾽ εὐρυχόρῳ ἐν πατρίδι τίμιος ἀστοῖς,
ὦ ἐμὸν ἐκμήνας θυμὸν ἔρωτι Δίων.

To Dion of Syracuse, the political figure of Syracuse whose campaign is discussed at length in the Platonic Epistles, or Letters. The Trojan loss of the Trojan war, as described in the Iliad, explains the decree of tears for Hecuba, Queen of Troy, and the women of Troy at the hands of the Fates, who represent the harsher inevitabilities of the human condition, such as death and destiny. Diogenes Laërtius reports this epigram was inscribed on the tomb of Dion at Syracuse. Greek Anthology, vii, 99.

- Now when I said nothing except just that Alexis is fair, he is looked at everywhere and by everyone when he appears. Why, my heart, dost thou point out bones to dogs and have to sorrow for it afterwards? Was it not thus that I lost Phaedrus?

νῦν ὅτε μηδέν, Ἄλεξις, ὅσον μόνον εἶφ᾽, ὅτι καλός,

ὦπται, καὶ πάντῃ πᾶσι περιβλέπεται.
θυμέ, τί μηνύεις κυσὶν ὀστέον, εἶτ᾽ ἀνιήσει
ὕστερον; οὐχ οὕτω Φαῖδρον ἀπωλέσαμεν;

About Alexis, possibly one of a number of already-named ancient personalities, or else a new personality of the same name altogether. Mentions Phaedrus, Plato's contemporary; namesake of the Platonic dialogue of the same name. Greek Anthology, vii, 100.

- I have a mistress, fair Archeanassa of Colophon, on whose very wrinkles sits hot love. O hapless ye who met such beauty on its first voyage, what a flame must have been kindled in you!

Ἀρχεάνασσαν ἔχω τὴν ἐκ Κολοφῶνος ἑταίραν,

ἧς καὶ ἐπὶ ῥυτίδων ἕζετο δριμὺς ἔρως.
ἆ δειλοὶ νεότητος ἀπαντήσαντες ἐκείνης
πρωτοπλόου, δι᾿ ὅσης ἤλθετε πυρκαϊῆς

This version found in Diogenes Laërtius' Life of Plato, translated by Robert Drew Hicks. Also found in the Deipnosophistae of Athenaeus, Book XIII.

I hold Archeanassa the courtesan from Colophon even on whose wrinkles sweet Love sat. Ah, ye lovers, who plucked the fresh flowers of her youth in its first piercing brilliance, through what a fiery furnace did you pass!
This version is found in the Greek Anthology, which attributes it to Asclepiades, and states "A slightly different version is attributed by Athenaeus to Plato". Greek Anthology, vii, 217.

Ἀρχεάνασσαν ἔχω, τὰν ἐκ Κολοφῶνος ἑταίραν,

ἇς καὶ ἐπὶ ῥυτίδων ὁ γλυκὺς ἕζετ᾽ Ἔρως.
ἆ νέον ἥβης ἄνθος ἀποδρέψαντες ἐρασταὶ
πρωτοβόλου, δι᾽ ὅσης ἤλθετε πυρκαϊῆς.

The version attributed to Plato was based on that by Asclepiades. The original is an epitaph, but the Platonic version is changed into an erotic epigram. Davide Massimo considers it a deliberate forgery, possibly by Pseudo-Aristippus.

- Leaving behind the sounding surge of the Aegean we lie on the midmost of the plains of Ecbatana. Farewell, Eretria, once our glorious country; farewell, Athens, the neighbour of Euboea; farewell, dear Sea.

οἵδε ποτ᾽ Αἰγαίοιο βαρύβρομον οἶδμα λιπόντες

Ἐκβατάνων πεδίῳ κείμεθ᾽ ἐνὶ μεσάτῳ.
χαῖρε, κλυτή ποτε πατρὶς Ἐρέτρια: χαίρετ᾽, Ἀθῆναι
γείτονες Εὐβοίης: χαῖρε, θάλασσα φίλη.

The Eretrians were deported and enslaved by the Persians in 490 BC. Greek Anthology, vii, 256.

- We are Eretrians from Euboea and we lie near Susa, alas! how far from our own land.

Εὐβοίης γένος ἐσμὲν Ἐρετρικόν, ἄγχι δὲ Σούσων

κείμεθα: φεῦ, γαίης ὅσσον ἀφ᾽ ἡμετέρης.

Greek Anthology, vii, 259.

- I am the tomb of a shipwrecked man, and that opposite is the tomb of a husbandman. So death lies in wait for us alike on sea and land.

Ναυηγοῦ τάφος εἰμί ὁ δ᾽ ἀντίον ἐστὶ γεωργοῦ:

ὡς ἁλὶ καὶ γαίῃ ξυνὸς ὕπεστ᾽ Ἀίδης.

Greek Anthology, vii, 265.

- I whom ye look upon am a shipwrecked man. The sea pitied me, and was ashamed to bare me of my last vesture. It was a man who with fearless hands stripped me, burdening himself with so heavy a crime for so light a gain. Let him put it on and take it with him to Hades, and let Minos see him wearing my old coat.

Ναυηγόν με δέδορκας. ὃν οἰκτείρασα θάλασσα

γυμνῶσαι πυμάτου φάρεος ᾐδέσατο,
ἄνθρωπος παλάμῃσιν ἀταρβήτοις μ᾽ ἀπέδυσε,
τόσσον ἄγος τόσσου κέρδεος ἀράμενος.
κεῖνο καὶ ἐνδύσαιτο, καὶ εἰς Ἀίδαο φέροιτο,
καί μιν ἴδοι Μίνως τοὐμὸν ἔχοντα ῥάκος.

Greek Anthology, vii, 268.

- Mariners, may ye be safe on sea and land; but know that this tomb ye are passing is a shipwrecked man's.

πλωτῆρες, σώζοισθε καὶ εἰν ἁλὶ καὶ κατὰ γαῖαν

ἴστε δὲ ναυηγοῦ σῆμα παρερχόμενοι.

Greek Anthology, vii, 269.

- Thou lookest on the stars, my Star. Would I were heaven, to look on thee with many eyes.

ἀστέρας εἰσαθρεῖς ἀστήρ ἐμός. εἴθε γενοίμην

οὐρανός, ὡς πολλοῖς ὄμμασιν εἰς σὲ βλέπω.

The first "Star" epigram, to Aster, a youth with whom Plato studied astronomy (according to Aristippus as quoted by Diogenes Laërtius (Note: Diogenes thought this was Aristippus of Cyrene, pupil of Socrates. However this cannot be correct for reasons of chronology. Davide Massimo calls him "Pseudo–Aristippus".)). Maurice Bowra thought it authentic, writing "the poems quoted are so good that they cannot be the work of a forger." Denys Page argued Aster was not a real person, and that the epigrams were probably not authentic. Greek Anthology, vii, 669.

- Of old among the living thou didst shine the Star of morn; now shinest thou in death the Star of eve.

ἀστὴρ πρὶν μὲν ἔλαμπες ἐνὶ ζωοῖσιν Ἑῷος:

νῦν δὲ θανὼν λάμπεις Ἕσπερος ἐν φθιμένοις.

The second "Star" epigram, a funerary epigram. Greek Anthology, vii, 670.

==== Book IX (Declamatory and Descriptive Epigrams) ====
- They planted me, a walnut-tree, by the road-side, to amuse passing boys, as a mark for their well-aimed stones. And all my twigs and flourishing shoots are broken, hit as I am by showers of pebbles. It is no advantage for trees to be fruitful. I indeed, poor tree, bore fruit only for my own undoing.

εἰνοδίην καρύην με παρερχομένοις ἐφύτευσαν

παισὶ λιθοβλήτου παίγνιον εὐστοχίης.

πάντας δ᾽ ἀκρεμόνας τε καὶ εὐθαλέας ὀροδάμνους
κέκλασμαι, πυκιναῖς χερμάσι βαλλομένη.

δένδρεσιν εὐκάρποις οὐδὲν πλέον ἦ γὰρ ἔγωγε
δυσδαίμων ἐς ἐμὴν ὕβριν ἐκαρποφόρουν.

Antipater (by some attributed to Plato). Greek Anthology, ix, 3.

- Cypris to the Muses: "Honour Aphrodite, ye maidens, or I will arm Love against you." And the Muses to Cypris: "Talk that twaddle to Ares. Your brat has no wings to fly to us."

ἁ Κύπρις Μούσαισι:

κοράσια, τὰν Ἀφροδίταν
τιμᾶτ᾽, ἢ τὸν Ἔρων ὔμμιν ἐφοπλίσομαι.
χαἰ Μοῦσαι ποτὶ Κύπριν
Ἄρει τὰ στωμύλα ταῦτα:
ἡμῖν δ᾽ οὐ πέτεται τοῦτο τὸ παιδάριον."

Attributed to "Musicius" by the anthology, but to Plato by Diogenes. Greek Anthology, ix, 39.

- A man finding gold left his halter, but the man who had left the gold and did not find it, hanged himself with the halter he found.

χρυσὸν ἀνὴρ εὑρὼν ἔλιπε βρόχον αὐτὰρ ὁ χρυσὸν

ὃν λίπεν οὐχ; εὑρὼν ἧψεν ὃν εὗρε βρόχον.

Also attributed to Statyllius Flaccus. Greek Anthology, ix, 44.

- Time brings everything; length of years can change names, forms, nature, and fortune.

αἰὼν πάντα φέρει: δολιχὸς χρόνος οἶδεν ἀμείβειν

οὔνομα καὶ μορφὴν καὶ φύσιν ἠδὲ τύχην.

Greek Anthology, ix, 51.

- Some say the Muses are nine, but how carelessly! Look at the tenth, Sappho from Lesbos.

ἐννέα τὰς Μούσας φασίν τινες: ὡς ὀλιγώρως:

ἠνίδε καὶ Σαπφὼ Λεσβόθεν ἡ δεκάτη.

Sappho of Lesbos, a female lyric poet, whose skill is complimented by counting her as a tenth Muse, a common appellation for Sappho in the ancient historical record. Greek Anthology, ix, 506.

- The little jasper stone is carved with five cows all looking alive as they feed. Perhaps they would run away, but now the little herd is confined in the golden pen.

εἰκόνα πέντε βοῶν μικρὰ λίθος εἶχεν ἴασπις,

ὡς ἤδη πάσας ἔμπνοα βοσκομένας.
καὶ τάχα κἂν ἀπέφευγε τὰ βοίδια: νῦν δὲ κρατεῖται
τῇ χρυσῇ μάνδρῃ τὸ βραχὺ βουκόλιον.

Also attributed to Plato the Younger. Greek Anthology, ix, 747.

- Let the cliff clothed in greenery of the Dryads keep silence, and the fountains that fall from the rock, and the confused bleating of the ewes newly lambed; for Pan himself plays on his sweet-toned pipe, running his pliant lips over the joined reeds, and around with their fresh feet they have started the dance, the Nymphs, Hydriads, and Hamadryads.

σιγάτω λάσιον Δρυάδων λέπας, οἳ τ᾽ ἀπὸ πέτρας

κρουνοί, καὶ βληχὴ πουλυμιγὴς τοκάδων,
αὐτὸς ἐπεὶ σύριγγι μελίζεται εὐκελάδῳ Πάν,
ὑγρὸν ἱεὶς ζευκτῶν χεῖλος ὑπὲρ καλάμων

αἱ δὲ πέριξ θαλεροῖσι χορὸν ποσὶν ἐστήσαντο
Ὑδριάδες Νύμφαι, Νύμφαι Ἁμαδρυάδες.

Greek Anthology, ix, 823.

- On a Satyr standing by a Well and Love Asleep: A cunning master wrought me, the Satyr, son of Bacchus, divinely inspiring the monolith with breath, I am the playmate of the Nymphs, and instead of purple wine I now pour forth pleasant water. Guide thy steps here in silence, lest thou disturb the boy lapped in soft sleep.

τὸν Βρομίου Σάτυρον τεχνήσατο δαιδαλέη χείρ,

μούνη θεσπεσίως πνεῦμα βαλοῦσα λίθῳ.
εἰμὶ δὲ ταῖς Νύμφαισιν ὁμέψιος: ἀντὶ δὲ τοῦ πρὶν
πορφυρέου μέθυος λαρὸν ὕδωρ προχέω.

εὔκηλον δ᾽ ἴθυνε φέρων πόδα, μὴ τάχα κοῦρον
κινήσῃς, ἁπαλῷ κώματι θελγόμενον.

Greek Anthology, ix, 826.

- I am the dear servant of horned Dionysus, and
  pour forth the water of the silver Naiads, soothing
  the young boy who rests asleep...

εἰμὶ μὲν εὐκεράοιο φίλος θεράπων Διονύσου,

λείβω δ᾽ ἀργυρέων ὕδατα Ναϊάδων
θέλγω δ᾽ ἠρεμέοντα νέον περὶ κώματι παῖδα

Primarily attributed to an unidentified "Ammonius". The final (fourth) line is missing. Greek Anthology, ix, 827.

==== Book XVI (Epigrams of the Planudean Anthology not in the Palatine Manuscript) ====
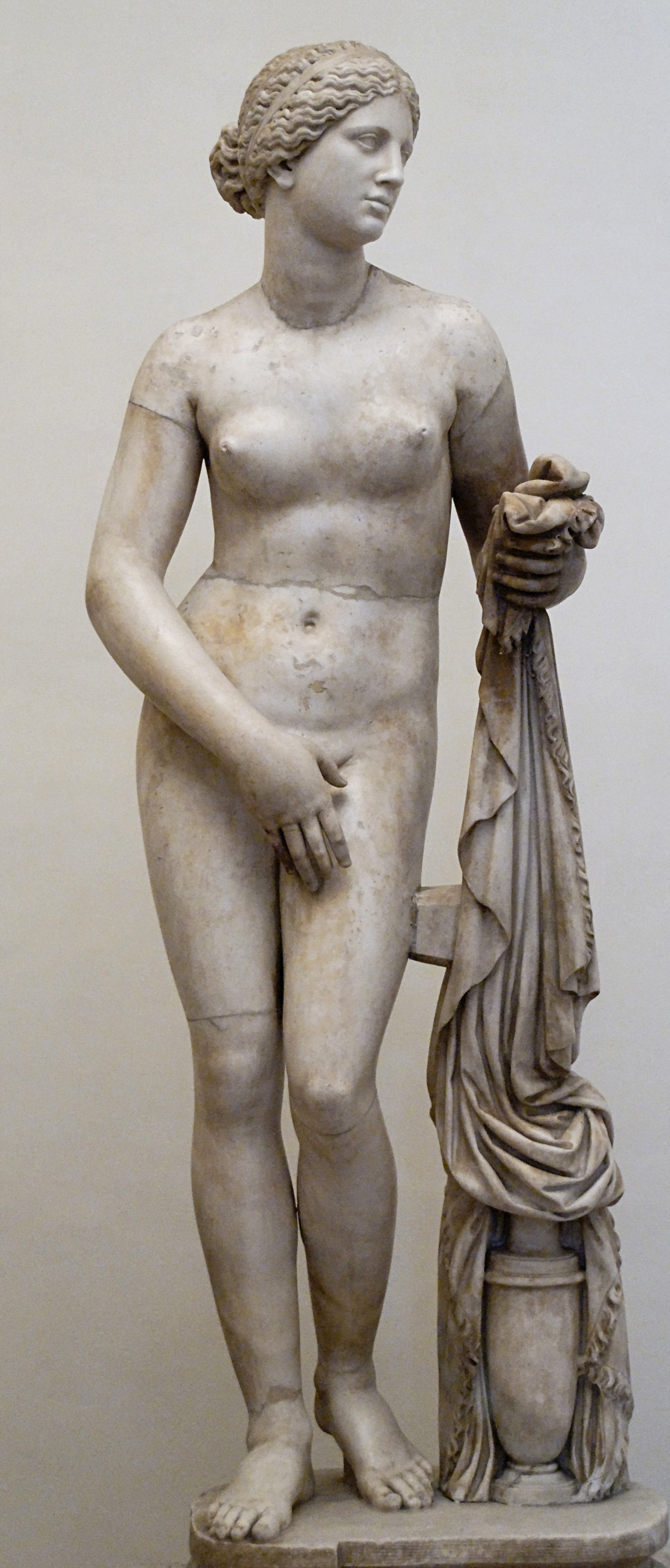
The Ludovisi Cnidan Aphrodite, a Roman marble copy of the original Aphrodite of Knidos, sculpted by Praxiteles

- Sit down by this high-foliaged vocal pine that quivers in the constant western breeze, and beside my plashing stream Pan's pipe shall bring slumber to thy charmed eyelids.

Ὑψίκομον παρὰ τάνδε καθίζεο φωνήεσσαν

φρίσσουσαν πυκινοῖς κῶνον ὑπὸ ζεφύροις,
καί σοι καχλάζουσιν ἐμοῖς παρὰ νάμασι σύριγξ
θελγομένων ἄξει κῶμα κατὰ βλεφάρων

From Book I of the Planudean Anthology, Declamatory Epigrams. "The attribution to Plato was probably based on the comparison with the Phaedrus... it is Pan who invites us to a nap." Greek Anthology, xvi, 13.

- Paphian Cytherea came through the waves to Cnidus, wishing to see her own image, and having viewed it from all sides in its open shrine, she cried, "Where did Praxiteles see me naked?" Praxiteles did not look on forbidden things, but the steel carved the Paphian as Ares would have her.

ἡ Παφίη Κυθέρεια, δι᾽ οἴδματος ἐς Κνίδον ἦλθε,

βουλομένη κατιδεῖν εἰκόνα τὴν ἰδίην

πάντῃ δ᾽ ἀθρήσασα περισκέπτῳ ἐνὶ χώρῳ,
φθέγξατο: ποῦ γυμνὴν εἶδέ με Πραξιτέλης;

Πραξιτέλης οὐκ εἶδεν ἃ μὴ θέμις: ἀλλ᾽ ὁ σίδηρος
ἔξεσεν οἷ᾽ ἂν Ἄρης ἤθελε τὴν Παφίην.

The goddess Cytherea (Aphrodite) views the sculpture Aphrodite of Knidos (Cnidus), sculpted by Praxiteles, and acknowledges it as a perfect likeness. The sculpture is now lost but was often copied. "Paphian" is a reference to the Aphrodite, who, according to legend, rose from the sea at Paphos, southwestern Cyprus. The W. R. Paton edition of the Greek Anthology states the last couplet is a later edition: "We know from Pliny that the shrine in which the statue stood was open on all sides." Greek Anthology, xvi, 160. From Book IV of the Planudean Anthology, Epigrams on monuments, statues, etc.

- Neither did Praxiteles nor the chisel work thee, but so thou standest as of old when thou camest to judgment.

οὔτε σε Πραξιτέλης τεχνάσατο, οὔθ᾽ ὁ σίδαρος:

ἀλλ᾽ οὕτως ἔστης, ὥς ποτε κρινομένη.

Also attributed to Plato the Younger. Greek Anthology, xvi, 161. From Book IV of the Planudean Anthology, Epigrams on monuments, statues, etc.

- Cypris, seeing Cypris in Cnidus, said, "Alas! alas! where did Praxiteles see me naked?"

ἁ Κύπρις τὰν Κύπριν ἐνὶ Κνίδῳ εἶπεν ἰδοῦσα

φεῦ, φεῦ: ποῦ γυμνὴν εἶδέ με Πραξιτέλης;

"Cypris" refers to Aphrodite. This epigram is considered anonymous by the Paton edition of the Greek Anthology, but J.M. Edmonds considers spurious the previous two on the same subject. Greek Anthology, xvi, 162. From Book IV of the Planudean Anthology, Epigrams on monuments, statues, etc.

- When we entered the deep-shadowed wood we found within it the son of Cytherea, like unto rosy apples. Nor had he the quiver that holds arrows, nor his bent bow, but they were hanging on the leafy trees, and he lay among the rose-blossoms smiling, bound fast by sleep, and above him the tawny bees were sprinkling on his dainty lips honey dripping from the comb.

ἄλσος δ᾽ ὡς ἱκόμεσθα βαθύσκιον, εὕρομεν ἔνδον

πορφυρέοις μήλοισιν ἐοικότα παῖδα Κυθήρης.
οὐδ᾽ ἔχεν ἰοδόκον φαρέτρην, οὐ καμπύλα τόξα:
ἀλλὰ τὰ μὲν δένδρεσσιν ὑπ᾽ εὐπετάλοισι κρέμαντο,

αὐτὸς δ᾽ ἐν καλύκεσσι ῥόδων πεπεδημένος ὕπνῳ
εὗδεν μειδιόων: ξουθαὶ δ᾽ ἐφύπερθε μέλισσαι
κηροχύτου μέλιτος ^ λαροῖς ἐπὶ χείλεσι ῥαῖνον

Greek Anthology, xvi, 210. From Book IV of the Planudean Anthology, Epigrams on monuments, statues, etc.

=== Further epigrams ===
- The Graces, when they wish’d to find A shrine, that should for ever live, Said, what they sought, alone the mind Of Aristophanes could give.

αἱ Χάριτες τέμενός τι λαβεῖν τόπερ οὔτι πεσεῖται ζητοῦσαι ψυχὴν εὗρον Ἀριστοφάνους
The Graces, representing the happier elements of the human condition, are associated with the playwright Aristophanes. Attributed to Plato by Olympiodorus the Younger in his "Life of Plato", and also by Thomas Magister in his Life of Aristophanes.

=== Plato the Younger ===
Plato the Younger, also known as Plato Junior and Plato Epigrammaticus, wrote in the 1st century AD.

- A blind man carried a lame man on his back, lending him his feet and borrowing from him his eyes.

Greek Anthology, ix, 13.

- On Dionysus carved on an Amethyst: The stone is amethyst, but I am the toper Dionysus. Either let it teach me to be sober, or learn itself to get drunk.

Amethyst means "Against drunkenness". Greek Anthology, ix, 748.

- The stone is Hyacinthus, and on it are Apollo and Daphne. Of which was Apollo rather the lover?

The stone is made of jacinth. Greek Anthology, ix, 751.

- On a Satyr chased on a Cup: Droporus did not engrave this Satyr, but sent him to sleep. Prod him and you will wake him up: the silver is asleep.

Also attributed to Antipater. Greek Anthology, xvi, 248.

=== Posidippus or Plato the Comic Poet ===
- What path of life should one pursue? In the market-place are broils and business difficulties, and at home are anxieties; in the country there is too much labour, and at sea there is fear. In a foreign land there is apprehension if you possess anything, and if you are ill off, life is a burden. You are married? You won't be without cares. You are unmarried? You live a still more lonely life. Children are a trouble, and a childless life is a crippled one. Youth is foolish, and old age again is feeble. There is then, it seems, a choice between two things, either not to be born or to die at once on being born.

Attributed to Posidippus or Plato the Comic Poet. Greek Anthology, ix, 359.
