= Cydantidae =

Coordinates: 38°02′51″N 23°53′31″E

Cydantidae or Kydantidai (Ancient Greek: Κυδαντίδαι) was a deme in ancient Attica, originally of the phyle of Aegeis, after 224/3 BCE of the phyle of Ptolemais, sending one or two delegates to the Athenian Boule.

This deme, along with that of Ionidae, venerated the kolokratai; these two demoi were the only ones, as far as we know, to venerate deities together.

Its site is located near Mendeli Monastery.

== People ==
- Nicias, Athenian politician and general
