= Clitophon (Athenian) =

Late 5th-century BC Athenian statesman

Clitophon, son of Aristonymus (Ancient Greek: Κλειτόφων Ἀριστωνύμου, Kleitóphōn Aristōnúmou, also transliterated as Cleitophon; mid-5th century – late 5th or early 4th century BCE) was an ancient Athenian oligarchic statesman and intellectual. His involvement in Athenian politics helped pave the way for the rule of the Four Hundred following the Athenian coup of 411 BCE. Clitophon also appears in the writing of Plato, and presents a philosophy of "thoroughgoing normative relativism" in a brief role in the Republic.

== Life ==
Little is known of Clitophon's early life. His participation in Athenian government reform following the calamitous Sicilian Expedition of 413 BCE dates his birth to 452 or earlier, as the council assembled to do so of which he was a part was composed of men aged over forty. The Constitution of Athens attributed to Aristotle names Clitophon as an early proponent of a return to the ancestral constitution (patrios politeia), a decisive move towards the oligarchy of the Four Hundred. The work also records his later serving as an ambassador to Lysander in 404, representing a brand of moderate oligarchy associated with figures like Theramenes.

== In literature ==
Plato depicts Clitophon as a close associate with the sophistic rhetorician Thrasymachus and the orator Lysias. Clitophon assists the former in Book 1 of Plato's Republic, positing a brief but significant relativistic argument that the advantage of the stronger is identical to whatever the stronger believes it to be. In the potentially apocryphal Platonic dialogue that bears his name he appears as a disgruntled student of Socrates, whom he attacks for the impracticality of, and lack of positive knowledge found in, the Socratic method.

The comedic playwright Aristophanes also paired Clitophon alongside Theramenes and parodied the two for their political fickleness in the Frogs.

== See also ==
- List of speakers in Plato's dialogues
