= Pyrilampes =

Athenian politician and stepfather of Plato

Pyrilampes (Ancient Greek: Πυριλάμπης) was an ancient Athenian politician and stepfather of the philosopher Plato. His dates of birth and death are unknown, but Debra Nails estimates he must have been born after 480 BC and died before 413 BC.

== Career ==
Pyrilampes served many times as an ambassador to the Persian court and was a friend of Pericles, the leader of the democratic faction in Athens. He was injured at the Battle of Delium in 424 BC, when he was in his mid-fifties. Pyrilampes raised and showed peacocks, gifts he had received on his Asian embassies. Plutarch states accusations against Pyrilampes, according to which he used the peacocks to procure freeborn women for Pericles.

== Personal life ==
Pyrilampes appears to have married his first wife in the late 440s; he had a son from this marriage, Demus, who was famous for his beauty. Around 423 BC, Pyrilampes was widowed and so was free to marry his niece, Perictione, Plato's mother. Perictione gave birth to Pyrilampes' second son, Antiphon, the half-brother of Plato, who appears in Parmenides in which he is said to have given up philosophy to devote most of his time to horses.
