= Scambonidae =

Coordinates: 37°58′44″N 23°43′34″E

Scambonidae or Skambonidai (Ancient Greek: Σκαμβωνίδαι) was a deme of ancient Attica, located in the city of Athens. It was located within the Themistoclean Wall, north of the Acropolis.

== Etymology ==
In the past it was believed that this deme was closely related to that of Melite because of its name: according to tradition, in fact, Myrmex or Dius, the father of Melite who would give the name to the other deme, built a street called Scambonidae. Today, however, it is believed that the name of the deme derives from its streets that, due to the hilly nature of the place, were full of curves (Ancient Greek: σκαμβός, romanized: skambós, "crooked").

== Description ==
The sacred calendar of Scambonidae, dating back to 460 BCE, is the oldest of its kind and also represents the first decree of a deme found to date. It regulates some religious issues, including the distribution of sacrificial meats and the participation of the deme in some festivals in the city. It also orders the distribution of the meat of the sacrifices to Leos to the citizens and to the Meteci. The presence of a square in the deme is also attested.

The deme had a sanctuary of Leos and an altar of Zeus and Athena.

The site of Scambonidae is located in the northern part of modern Athens.

== People ==
- Alcibiades, Athenian statesman, orator, and general
- Axiochus, Athenian politician
