= Adeimantus of Collytus =

Brother of Plato (c. 442 BC – 382 BC)

Adeimantus of Collytus (Greek: Ἀδείμαντος; c. 442 BC – 382 BC), son of Ariston of Athens, was an ancient Athenian Greek best known as Plato's brother. He plays an important part in Plato's Republic and is mentioned in the Apology and Parmenides dialogues.

In the Republic, Adeimantus is noted for his concern for education, which is apparent from the moment he becomes involved in the discussion. He is also concerned with the happiness of the auxiliaries in the ideal city. He questions whether they would be living a good life with little or no personal property. Consequently, Adeimantus is often associated with greed or love for money in interpretations of the dialogue. On the whole, Adeimantus comes across as more cautious, more sober-minded, and less creative than his brother Glaucon, Socrates' other major interlocutor in the last nine books of the Republic.

== See also ==
- List of speakers in Plato's dialogues
