= On Justice =

Ancient Greek dialogue

On Justice (Ancient Greek: Περὶ Δικαίου; Latin: De Justo) is a Socratic dialogue that was once thought to be the work of Plato. In the short dialogue, Socrates discusses with a friend questions about what is just and unjust.

This work is not to be confused with Plato's Republic, whose alternate title in ancient times was also On Justice.
