= Protagoras (dialogue) =

Platonic dialogue

Protagoras (/proʊˈtæɡərəs, -æs/ proh-TAG-ər-əs, -ass; Ancient Greek: Πρωταγόρας) is a dialogue by Plato. The traditional subtitle (which may or may not be Plato's) is "or the Sophists". The main argument is between Socrates and the elderly Protagoras, a celebrated sophist and philosopher. The discussion takes place at the home of Callias, who is host to Protagoras while he is in town. The philosophical issues raised in the Protagoras include the unity and the teachability of virtue, and the relationship between pleasure and goodness.

== The characters ==
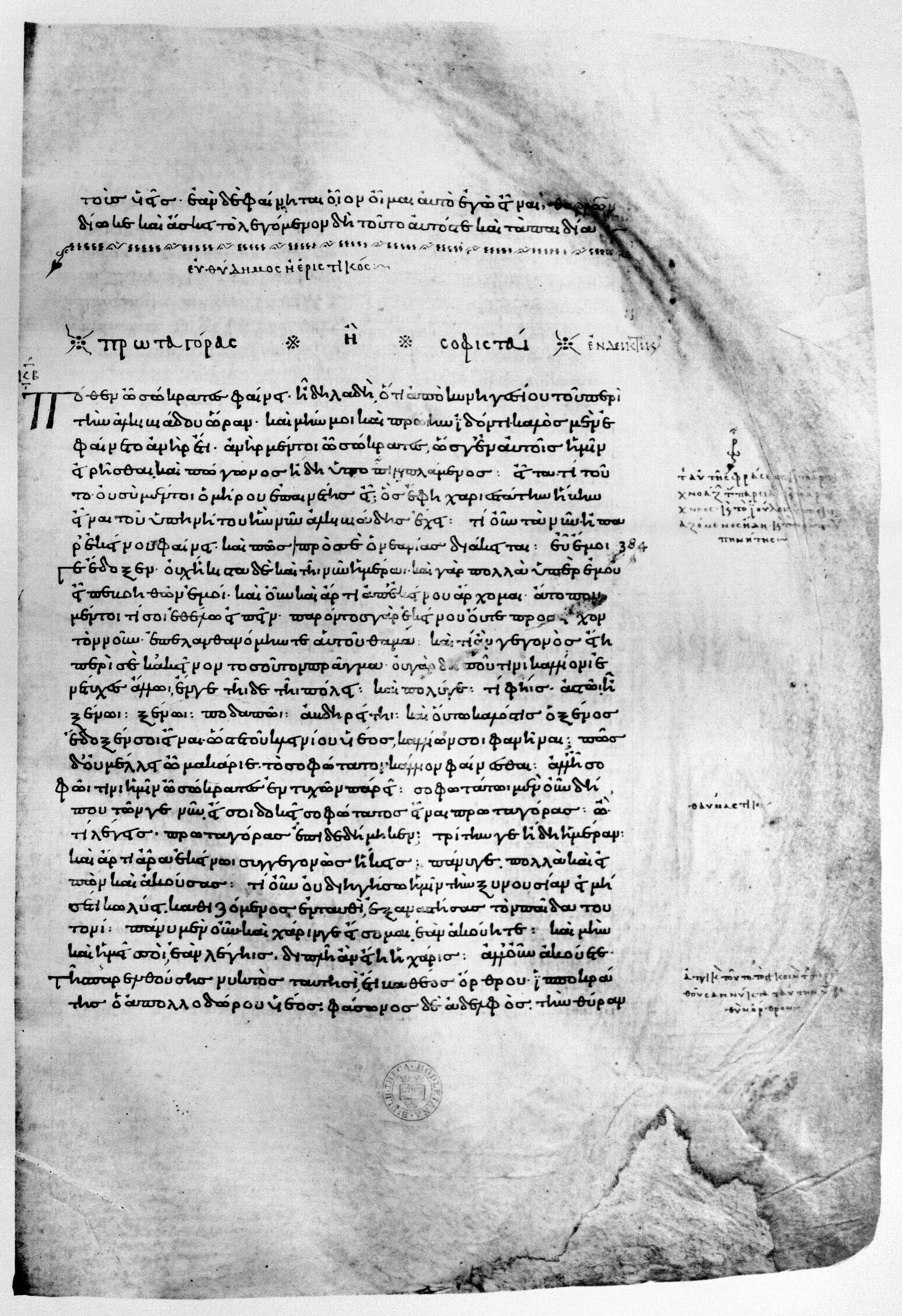
Protagoras

Of the twenty-one people who are specifically said to be present, three are known sophists. In addition to Protagoras himself, there are Hippias of Elis and Prodicus of Ceos. Two of the sons of Pericles are said to be there, Paralus and Xanthippus. With the exception of Aristophanes, all of Socrates' named friends from the Symposium are in attendance: Eryximachus the doctor, Phaedrus, the lovers Pausanias and Agathon (who is said to be a mere boy at this point), and Alcibiades. Additionally, there are several unnamed foreigners whom Protagoras is said to have picked up in his travels and a servant (a eunuch) in the employ of Callias.

== The dialogue ==
=== Introduction ===
The dialogue begins with an unnamed friend of Socrates asking him how his pursuit of the young Alcibiades, just now reputed to be growing his first beard, is proceeding. Socrates explains that while he has just been in the company of Alcibiades, his mind is now on more interesting matters. He says that the Sophist Protagoras, the wisest man alive (309c–d), is in town. Socrates relates the story of how his young friend, Hippocrates, son of Apollodorus, came knocking on his door before daybreak and roused him out of bed. Hippocrates was in a big hurry to be present when Protagoras held court, as he was expected to do, at the home of Callias, and wanted Socrates to introduce him as a potential student to the old Sophist, as Protagoras had a great reputation as a teacher.

=== Socrates examines Hippocrates ===
Socrates warns the excitable Hippocrates that Sophists are dangerous. He tells him that the words of the Sophists go straight into the soul (psychē) and can corrupt a person straightaway. Socrates says that buying wisdom from a Sophist is different from buying food and drink at the market. With food and drink, you never know what you are getting, but you can consult experts for advice before consuming anything that might be dangerous (313a–314c).

Socrates says he regards Prodicus as a man of inspired genius (316a). He expresses the same admiration for Prodicus in another dialogue, the Theaetetus. Socrates later notes that Prodicus was assigned to sleep in a storage room that his host had cleaned out for the visit (315d).

=== At the house of Callias ===
Socrates accompanies Hippocrates to the home of Callias, and they stand in the doorway chatting about "some point which had come up along the road" (314c). A eunuch opens the door, takes one look at them, guesses they are Sophists, and slams the door in their faces (314d). They knock again, and this time assure the porter they are not Sophists, but only want to visit Protagoras. The porter lets them in, and it is at this point that Socrates recites the list of guests. Upon entering, Socrates and young Hippocrates witness the great Sophist Protagoras walking around the cloister, surrounded by numerous men, some of them famous Athenians which Socrates mentioned by name, like Charmides and the two sons of Pericles. Plato describes how the crowd opens and reassembles behind Protagoras every time the Sophist makes a turn while walking.

=== Protagoras the sophist ===
Protagoras does not deny being a Sophist, and claims that it is an ancient and honorable art, the same art practiced by Homer and Hesiod. These poets, he says, used the arts as a screen, a front, to protect themselves from the charge. He says that he is more straightforward than the ancient artists, trainers, and musicians in frankly admitting that he is an educator. Protagoras says he is old enough now to be the father of any of the men present, and would like now to address himself to the whole company of people in the house. Socrates assumes that Prodicus would not want to miss the lecture, and so Callias and Alcibiades are sent to rouse him from his bed (317c–e).

=== Protagoras' opening speech ===
Socrates asks Protagoras "in respect to what" Hippocrates will improve by associating with him, as, for example, he would improve in medicine by associating himself with a doctor (318d). Protagoras begins by saying that a good Sophist can make his students into good citizens by teaching civic virtue (πολιτικὴν τέχνην). Socrates says that this is fine and good, but that he personally believes that this is not feasible since virtue cannot be taught (319b). He adds that technical skill (technē) can be imparted to students by teachers, but that wisdom cannot be. By way of example, Socrates points to the fact that while in matters concerning specialised labour one would take advice only from the appropriate specialist, like for example builders (τέκτονες) about construction, in matters of state everyone's opinions are considered, which proves that political virtue is within everyone, or that at least that is what Athenians in their democratic ideals believe. Another example is that Pericles did not manage to impart his wisdom to his sons (319e). Socrates then adds that Clinias, younger brother of Alcibiades, was taken from his family for fear that Alcibiades would corrupt him, and he was given back as a hopeless case. Socrates says he could give more examples, but thinks his point is sufficiently established.

=== Protagoras' mythos ===
Protagoras says his claim that virtue can be taught is better illustrated by a myth than by reasoned arguments, and he recounts a myth about the origins of living things. After the gods had created the animals including man, they assigned two Titan brothers, Epimetheus ("afterthought") and Prometheus ("forethought"), with the task of giving each their proper traits for survival. The two agreed that Epimetheus would do the dealing, while Prometheus would check on his brother's work. And so, Epimetheus began by giving strength to some, speed to some, and wings, claws, hooves, pelts and hides to others. But being a little foolish, or rather a "late-thinker" as his name implies, Epimetheus forgot to save something for man. When Prometheus saw what had happened, he realised that without pelts or claws, mankind was doomed, and so he decided to go secretly into the gods' mountain home of Olympus and steal something to give back to man. Initially, Prometheus wanted to steal temperance (sophrosyne), but this virtue was guarded inside the palace of Zeus by terrible guardians, and so, the Titan opted for the gift of fire straight from the workshop of Hephaestus and practical wisdom from the goddess Athena. Because Prometheus failed to enter the palace of Zeus, however, man was never granted civic wisdom, and so his race was still in danger of extinction. Seeing this, Zeus sent Hermes to distribute shame and justice among human beings, and to do so equally. To Protagoras, this answers Socrates' question as to why people think that wisdom about architecture or medicine is limited to the few while wisdom about justice and politics is more broadly understood (322d).

=== Protagoras' logos ===
Protagoras states that he has two good pieces of evidence that people agree with him. First, people do not rebuke the ugly, dwarfish, and weak, but pity them, because they cannot help being as they are, yet they punish the unjust and generally feel as though someone is responsible for not knowing something that can be taught (323d). Second, they do instruct people who are unjust and irreligious, hoping to impart goodness to them. He says that parents begin with their children from earliest childhood, and teachers carry on the task. Protagoras notes that none of this is surprising, but what would be surprising is if this were not the case (326e). He closes by addressing Socrates' question of why, if virtue is teachable, the sons of virtuous men often lack virtue. Protagoras lays out a thought experiment in which the survival of a hypothetical city-state rests on the skill of flute playing. Naturally, all parents would be eager to teach their sons how to play the flute, but given the importance of this skill, everyone would also be teaching everyone else, as it would be considered a crime to withhold this knowledge. The result would be a city where everyone would be at least decent in the art, but being taught constantly and by everyone, those naturally gifted would always be better than those who happen to have gifted parents. The same goes for virtue. It is considered so important that everyone is taught to a certain degree by everyone else, and to the point that it seems like a part of human nature, while children of virtuous men do not always exceed the rest (327b–d).

=== Socrates' complaint ===
Socrates admits that Protagoras has given an excellent answer and that there is only one small thing to clarify, which he is certain that the Sophist will do easily. He asks Protagoras as to whether the attributes that form virtue, such as bravery, kindness and wisdom, are one thing, like for example the parts of a golden object which are fused together, or many things, like features of a face that form a whole while retaining their individual substance (329d). Protagoras answers the second, but avoids engaging in dialogue and digresses into rhetoric that does not answer the question sufficiently but still manages to arouse the excitement of their young public. It is a typical occurrence in a Socratic dialogue that a Sophist uses eloquent speeches to hide the inconsistency of his arguments. Socrates' move is to pretend that he has a weak memory (334c), and that for the debate to continue, Protagoras needs to answer in a concise manner. This forces the Sophist to use Socrates' notorious method, his unique question/answer format that can lead to a logical conclusion, usually in Socrates' favour. Protagoras begins to bristle at this and replies that his answers are as long as they need to be, while Socrates reminds him that as a teacher of rhetoric, and one that advertises his ability to teach others all the different ways a debate can be had, he above all should be able to shorten his answers when the need arises. Their argument over form appears to be leading them nowhere, and Socrates gets up to leave, grousing that companionable talk is one thing while public speaking is another (336b). After the intervention of several of the listeners, the men agree to compromise their styles so the discussion can continue.

Socrates praises the Spartans as the best people in the world, not only because of their fierceness in battle but also because of their wisdom and philosophical skills. This is contrary to the common belief that the Spartans lacked these qualities and devoted themselves exclusively to physical training, but Socrates claims that they are masters at concealing their skills. While they appear to be unimpressive speakers, at just the right moment, they can provide pithy phrases of wisdom (342e). He adds that Laconic brevity was the earliest characteristic of philosophy (343b).

Then the debaters return to their previous analysis of Pittacus' and Simonides' poetry. On Socrates' interpretation, Pittacus claims that it is difficult to be a good man, but presumably possible. Simonides, on the other hand, claims that it is impossible to live without ever being a bad man, and even to be a good man on occasion is difficult (344a–45d). Simonides praises those who at least do not do wrong willingly. Socrates' interpretation is that, since Simonides was a wise man, he must know that no one does any wrong willingly; accordingly, he must mean that he will willingly praise those who do no wrong, not that some do wrong willingly and others unwillingly, with only the latter garnering his praise (345d–46b). Socrates thus argues that the authority of Simonides does not stand against his understanding of virtue and whether anyone willingly does wrong.

=== Socrates' major argument ===
Socrates then repeats the initial question of whether virtue is one or many things, and he reminds Protagoras that his answer was the latter, that virtues are many (349b-d). Protagoras accepts that this was indeed his original position, and that while the virtues are certainly connected, courage more than any other can be shown to be independent, as there are many who are both unwise and courageous. Socrates proceeds using his method, and asks whether the most courageous soldiers are those who are ignorant or knowledgeable of fighting. Protagoras says that while there are those who are courageous while being ignorant, their courage is more like madness, and that to be considered truly courageous, one needs to know what he is engaged in. But after agreeing that courageous people are necessarily knowledgeable, and therefore wise, Protagoras sees through Socrates' tricks, as the latter was indeed trying to push for a unification theory of virtue on the premise that everything, courage and justice included, are essentially wisdom, and therefore the same thing. Protagoras tells Socrates that while he agreed that the courageous are knowledgeable, he did not agree about the inverse, that wise men are also courageous. The link between courage and knowledge in other words is not symmetric (350c-351b). Socrates needs to start another thread.

Socrates finally asks why it is that men do harm to themselves, by overeating or overindulging in other pleasures, and asks Protagoras whether his view is the standard one, that these men do so because of pleasure. Protagoras agrees, and Socrates continues by saying that what we call bad is not necessarily unpleasant in the short term, but necessarily so in the long term, like certain foods that cause pleasurable sensations but harm the body in the long run.

Socrates then concludes that the only reason why people exchange good for bad, like the pleasant taste of food for the sickness that comes by eating it, is because they do not know that the first (the pleasure) is short, while the second (the pain) is long. The error they make is just like one in judging the sizes of different objects when they are far away, assuming one is smaller because it's further away. So if men were taught the art of calculating these things correctly, they would not act harmfully (357c–358d). To be "overcome by pleasure" then means just this, ignorance. So, in a way, all virtues are essentially knowledge and can be considered one and the same, more like parts of golden objects (as discussed above) rather than the parts of a face. And that's how the issue of courage can finally be addressed, after Socrates was cut short by Protagoras only a short time before. Given that courage is good, as both agree, then the lack of it, must necessarily be a lack of knowledge, and so Protagoras was wrong in saying that some courageous men are also ignorant.

=== Conclusion: The mutual exchange of the debator's positions ===
While Socrates seems to have won the argument, he points to the fact that if all virtue is knowledge, it can in fact be taught. He draws the conclusion that to an observer he and Protagoras would seem crazy, having argued at great lengths only to mutually exchange positions, with Socrates now believing that virtue can be taught and Protagoras that all virtues are one (361a). Protagoras acknowledges that Socrates is a notable opponent in dispute while being much younger than he and predicts that he could become one of the wisest men alive. Socrates departs for whatever business he claimed he had when he wanted to end the dialogue earlier.

== Texts and translations ==
- Beresford, A., Plato. Protagoras and Meno (Penguin, 2005). ISBN 978-0140449037 (English with notes)
- Burnet, J., Plato. Opera, Vol. III (Oxford University Press, 1922). ISBN 978-0-19-814542-4 (Greek with critical apparatus)
- Denyer, N., Plato. Protagoras (Cambridge University Press, 2008). ISBN 978-0-521-54969-1 (Greek with English commentary)
- Lamb, W. R. M., Plato, Vol. II (Harvard University Press, 1924). ISBN 978-0-674-99183-5 (Greek and English)
- Lombardo, S. & Bell, K., Plato. Protagoras (Hackett Publishing, 1992). ISBN 978-0-87220-094-4 (English with notes)
- Taylor, C. C. W., Plato. Protagoras, Revised Edition (Oxford University Press, 1990). ISBN 978-0-19-823934-5 (English with commentary)
- Bartlett, R. Protagoras and Meno (Cornell University Press, 2004). ISBN 978-0801488658 (English with notes and commentary)
- Guthrie, W. K. C., Plato. Protagoras and Meno (Penguin Books, 1956). ISBN 9780140440683 (English)

== See also ==
- Orthotes onomaton

== Sources ==
- Rudolph H. Weingartner, The Unity of the Platonic Dialogue, University of Chicago Press, 1973, p. 75.
