= On Virtue =

Socratic dialogue attributed to Plato

On Virtue (Ancient Greek: Περὶ Ἀρετῆς; Latin: De Virtute) is a Socratic dialogue attributed to Plato, but which is considered spurious. In the short dialogue, Socrates discusses with a friend questions about whether virtue can be taught. To answer this question, the author of the dialogue does little more than copy out a few passages from the Meno almost word for word.
