= Demodocus (dialogue) =

Purported dialogue of Plato

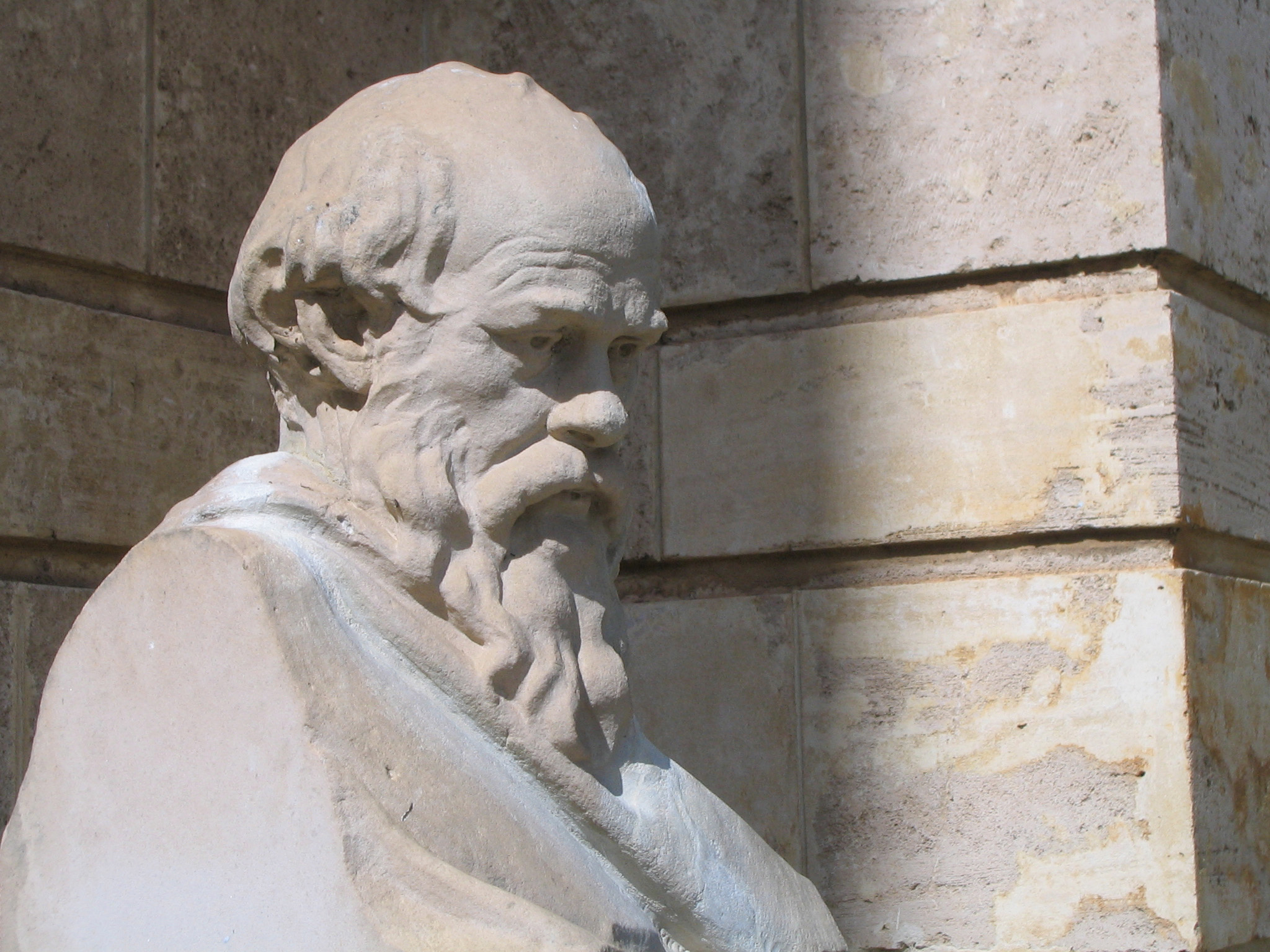
Demodocus (dialogue)

Demodocus (/dɪˈmɒdəkəs/; Greek: Δημόδοκος) is purported to be one of the Dialogues of Plato. The dialogue is extant and was included in the Stephanus edition published in Geneva in 1578. It is now generally acknowledged to be a fabrication by a late sophist or rhetorician, probably later than mid-fourth century BC.

It appears to be a combination of two separate works. The first part is a monologue (addressed to Demodocus), which argues against collective decision-making. There then follows a trilogy of dialogues (with anonymous participants) which raise three elements of doubt against common sense.
