= Glaucon =

Older brother of Plato (born c. 445 BC)

Glaucon (/ˈɡlɔːkɒn/; Greek: Γλαύκων; c. 445 BC – 4th century BC), son of Ariston, was an ancient Athenian and Plato's older brother. He is primarily known as a major conversant with Socrates in the Republic. According to Debra Nails, two major facts about Glaucon's life can be ascertained from a single comment by Socrates in the Republic, that Glaucon was old enough to have distinguished himself in a battle at Megara, and that he was the eromenos of the poet and statesman Critias. In Book V of the Republic, an exchange between Socrates and Glaucon indicates that Glaucon owned property where he kept and bred sporting dogs and game birds.

He is also referenced briefly in the beginnings of two other dialogues of Plato, the Parmenides and Symposium. Glaucon also appears in Xenophon's Memorabilia, and is referenced in Aristotle's Poetics, where Aristotle states: "The true mode of interpretation is the precise opposite of what Glaucon mentions. Critics, he says, jump at certain groundless conclusions; they pass adverse judgement and then proceed to reason on it; and, assuming that the poet has said whatever they happen to think, find fault if a thing is inconsistent with their own fancy."

A later doxographical tradition, recorded by Diogenes Laertius, attributed nine dialogues to Glaucon: Phidylus, Euripides, Amyntichus, Euthias, Lysithides, Aristophanes, Cephalus, Anaxiphemus, and Menexenus, Laërtius, Diogenes. "Socrates, with predecessors and followers: Glaucon" . Lives of the Eminent Philosophers. Vol. 1:2. Translated by Hicks, Robert Drew (Two volume ed.). Loeb Classical Library. § 124. However, no trace of these works remains.

== Biography ==
Glaucon's family lived in the district of Collytus on the outskirts of Athens, which is where Glaucon was born. His father, Ariston, and his mother, Perictione, had four children according to Diogenes Laërtius—Glaucon, Adeimantus, Plato, and a daughter, Potone. He also had a half-brother named Antiphon according to the Parmenides dialogues. Their family was established, wealthy, and successful.

Glaucon distinguished himself in a battle at Megara, which may have been a battle in 424 BC, 409 BC, or 405 BC. Due to constant warfare between Athens and Megara, the battle in question may also be a more minor skirmish with an unknown date.

Glaucon and Plato belonged to Socrates' circle of wealthy young students. Although little is known about Glaucon's life, some information can be gleaned from his brother's writings and from later Platonic biographers.

== Glaucon in Book II of the Republic ==
Much of what is known about Glaucon comes from Plato's works, particularly the Republic, where he is one of Socrates' main interlocutors. As Plato himself points out, Glaucon is a very courageous and bold interlocutor who does not hesitate to express his doubts about Socrates' refutation of Thrasymachus.

His speech opens with a classification of goods, which will be taken up later by other ancient philosophers, including Aristotle. According to Glaucon, there are goods that we desire for themselves, regardless of their consequences, because they are "harmless pleasures that involve nothing in the future except the joy of experiencing them", others that we desire for themselves and for their advantages (such as sight and intelligence) and still others that in themselves are less than desirable or cost us effort, but which we are happy to possess for the consequences they have (such as being treated in case of illness or doing gymnastics). This classification is used by Glaucon to introduce his argument, according to which justice, for the majority of people, belongs to the last category of goods, because in itself it should be avoided, but it is necessary to have money and a good reputation. At this point, Glaucon manifests his desire to reinforce Thrasymachus' thesis (justice as the benefit of the strongest), refuted by Socrates in an unsatisfactory way in his opinion, building a genesis of justice that is complementary to it. According to some interpretations, Glaucon chooses to support Thrasymachus's thesis only to spur Socrates to defend justice in a satisfactory way.

== See also ==
- List of speakers in Plato's dialogues
