= Eryxias (dialogue) =

Dialogue attributed to Plato

Eryxias (/ɪˈrɪksiəs/; Ancient Greek: Ἐρυξίας) is a Socratic dialogue attributed to Plato, but which is considered spurious. It is set in the Stoa of Zeus Eleutherios, and features Socrates in conversation with Critias, Eryxias, and Erasistratus (nephew of Phaeax).

The dialogue concerns the topic of wealth and virtue. The position of Eryxias that it is good to be materially prosperous is defeated when Critias argues that having money is not always a good thing. Socrates then shows that money has only a conventional value. In an argument addressed to Critias, Socrates concludes that money can never be considered useful, even when it is used to buy something useful. The final conclusion of the Eryxias is that the most wealthy are the most wretched because they have so many material wants.
