= Axiochus (dialogue) =

Ancient Greek dialogue

Axiochus (Greek: Ἀξίοχος) is a Socratic dialogue attributed to Plato, but which has been considered spurious since the 1st century AD. The work dates from the Hellenistic era, c. 1st century BC. The author was probably a Platonist, or perhaps a Neopythagorean. It forms part of the consolation literature which was popular in Hellenistic and Roman era, although it is unusual in being addressed to someone who is close to death, rather than someone who has lost a loved-one.

In the dialogue, Axiochus has come close to death, and is scared by the experience, despite his familiarity with the arguments which were supposed to make him scorn the fear of death. Socrates is summoned to his bedside, and consoles him with a wide variety of teachings to help Axiochus welcome death as the release of the soul to a better place.
