= List of cultural depictions of Socrates =

Socrates has frequently been featured in or the subject of literature, theater, film, television, and art.

== Art ==
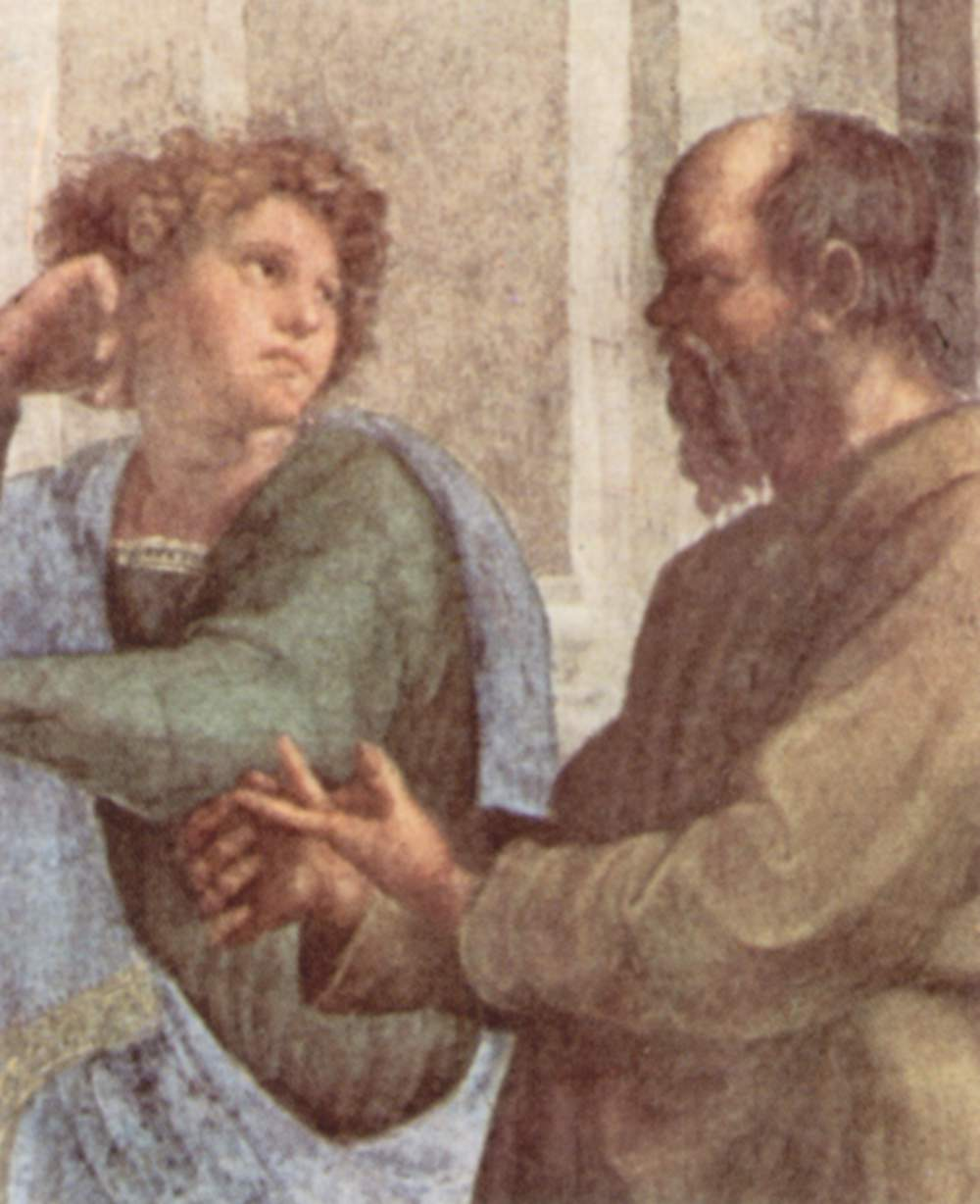
Aeschines and Socrates in Raphael's The School of Athens

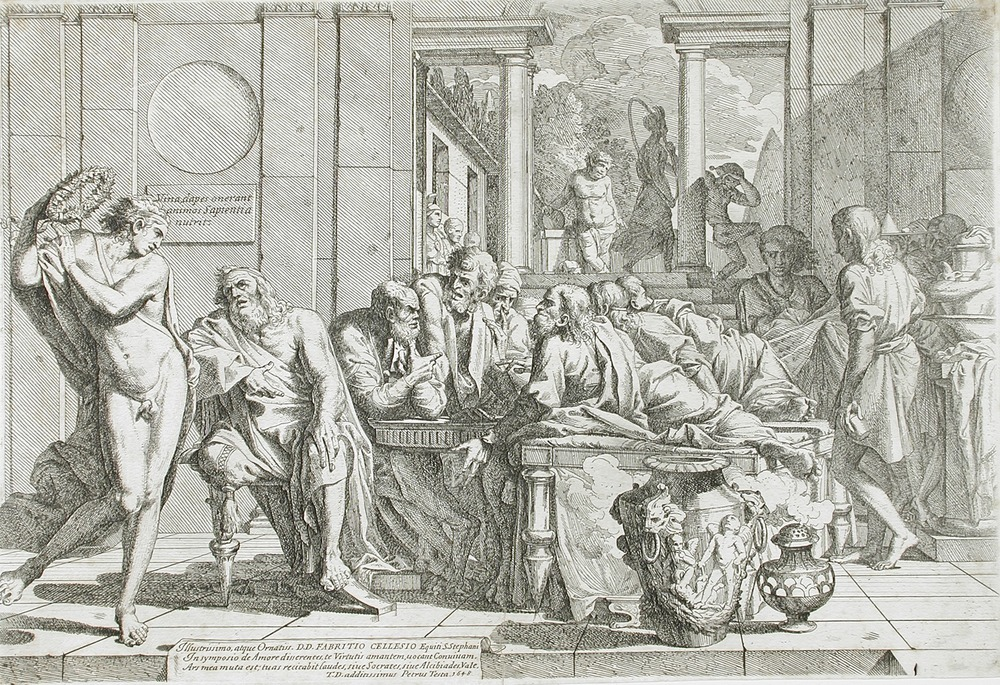
Pietro Testa's etching of the Symposium (1648)

- The Apotheosis of Homer (1827)
- The Death of Socrates (1787)
- Double Herm of Socrates and Seneca (3rd century AD)
- The School of Athens (c. 1511)
- Socrates (c. 1950)
- Socrates, his two Wives, and Alcibiades (1660s)
- Symposium (Feuerbach) (1869)

== Literature ==
- Divine Comedy (1321)
- Alcibiades the Schoolboy (1652)
- The Crown of Violet (1952) Historical junior novel by Geoffrey Trease, in which young Alexis uncovers a plot to overthrow the athenian democracy and also publicly defends Socrates with his debut theater play "The Gadfly".
- Creation (1981)
  Historical fiction novel by Gore Vidal in which a Achaemenid Persian diplomat meets historical figures, including Socrates
- De genio Socratis
- The Just City (2015)
- The Last of the Wine (1956)
- The Plot to Save Socrates (2006)
- The True Apology of Socrates by Kostas Varnalis (1931)

== Music ==
- "Bruces' Philosophers Song" (1973)
- Der geduldige Socrates (1721)
- Serenade after Plato's "Symposium" (1954)
- Socrate (1919)

== Screen ==
- Barefoot in Athens (1966)
  Hallmark Hall of Fame television film on the last days of Socrates, starring Peter Ustinov as Socrates
- Bill & Ted's Excellent Adventure (1989)
  Science fiction comedy film in which time-traveling teenagers assemble historical figures, including Socrates, portrayed by Tony Steedman, for a high school presentation. The title characters continuously pronounce his name as the two syllable 'So-Crates'
- Meeting of Minds (1977–1981)
- The Philosophers' Football Match (1972), in which he scores the winning goal
- Socrates (1971)

== Stage ==
- The Clouds (423 BC)
  Ancient Greek comedy by Aristophanes that lampoons intellectualism in classical Athens; Socrates features prominently
- Socrates (1759)
- Socrates on Trial (2007)

== Video Games ==
- The Battle Cats (2012)
  Socrates appears as Sage of Mind Soractes a boss and unit in the game.
- Assassin's Creed Odyssey (2018)
  Socrates (stylized as Sokrates) is a side character in the Ubisoft game where the player can complete quests given by Socrates which involve philosophical dilemmas, much to the annoyance of the main character.
- Civilization VII (2025)
  Socrates appears as a Great Person for the Greek Empire during the ancient era. He can be used on a palace or city hall, adding +2 influence to the building.
