= Myrto =

Socrates's wife according to some accounts

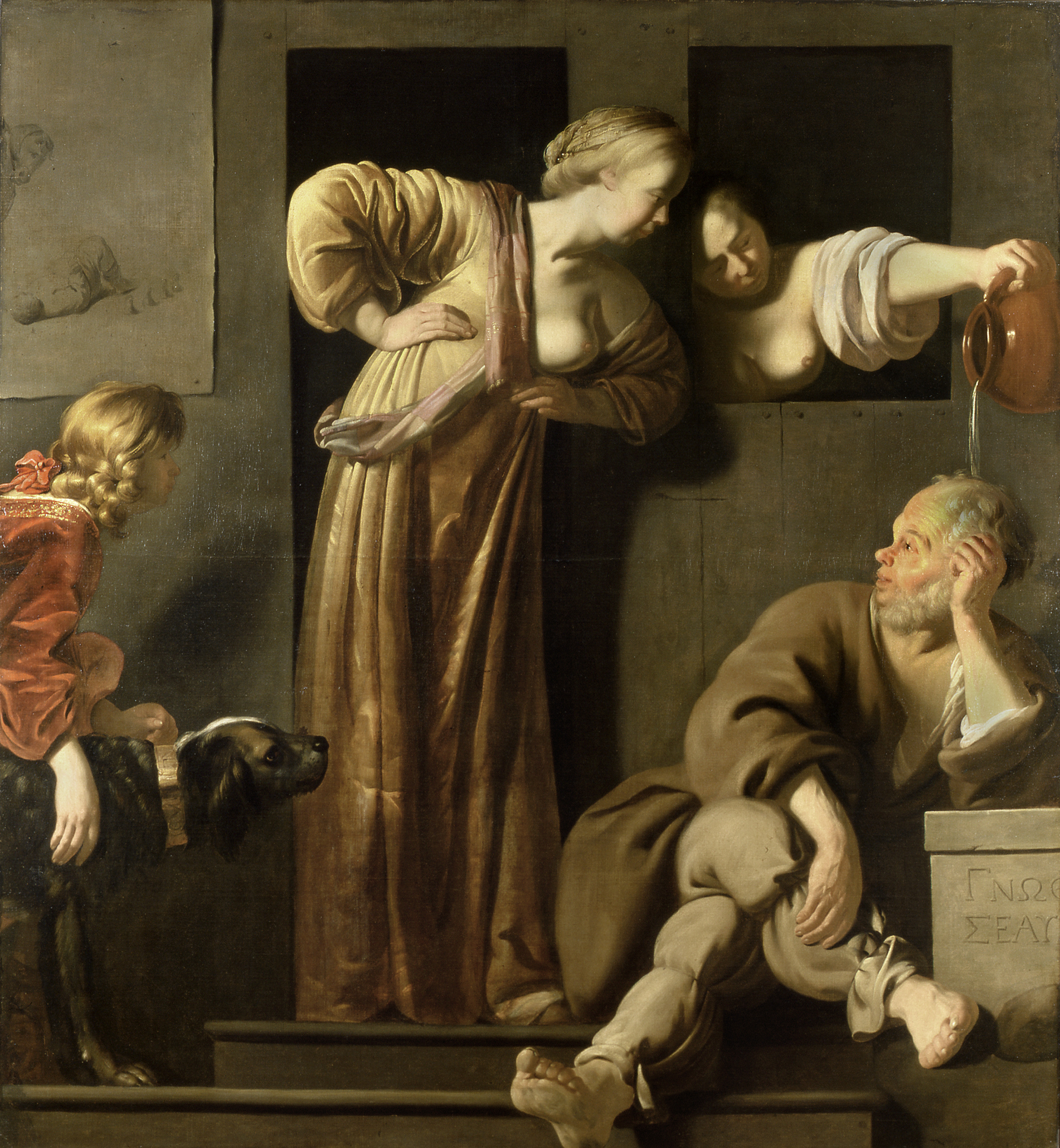
Socrates, his two Wives, and Alcibiades. Painting by Reyer van Blommendael

Myrto (/ˈmɜːrtoʊ/; Greek: Μυρτώ; fl. 5th century BC) was a descendant of the Athenian politician Aristides and, according to some accounts, a wife of Socrates. The exact details of both of these relationships is uncertain. Ancient sources variously call her a daughter, granddaughter, or great-granddaughter of Aristides; it was also disputed whether she was the first or second wife of Socrates, or married to him simultaneously with Xanthippe. The historicity of Socrates' marriage to Myrto, already questioned in antiquity, has been frequently disputed since the nineteenth century, though since the 1970s it has been taken seriously by scholars once again.

== Sources ==
Neither Plato nor Xenophon, the earliest sources on Socrates' life, mention Myrto. Diogenes Laertius, Athenaeus, and Plutarch all cite Aristotle's treatise On Being Well-Born as the source of Myrto's story. Though surviving fragments of the treatise do mention a "daughter of Aristides", they neither talk about Myrto by name or suggest any relationship with Socrates. Additionally, in the Rhetoric, Aristotle cites Socrates' family alongside those of Pericles and Cimon as being of noble birth; this may allude to the story that he had children by Myrto.

Ten surviving ancient sources discuss Myrto's relationship with Socrates; eight ultimately draw their information from Aristotle, while two more may be independent of this. These are the philosophical dialogue Halcyon, which was preserved as part of the works of both Plato and Lucian of Samosata but is by neither author; and a letter supposedly from Socrates' pupil Aristippus to his daughter Arete but in reality probably composed in the second century AD.

== Relationship to Aristides ==
Different sources call Myrto either the daughter, granddaughter, or great-granddaughter of Aristides. As any daughter of Aristides must have been no more than a few years younger than Socrates (Note: Socrates was born around 470 BC; Aristides died around 467. Additionally Aristides' son Lysimachus was apparently a contemporary of Socrates' father, suggesting that his daughters were also older than Socrates.) – and hence at least sixty-seven by the time of Socrates' trial, when her sons would supposedly have still been children – she cannot have been the daughter of Aristides; David Lévystone argues on both textual and chronological grounds that the most plausible interpretation is that Myrto was the granddaughter of Aristides.

== Relationship to Socrates ==
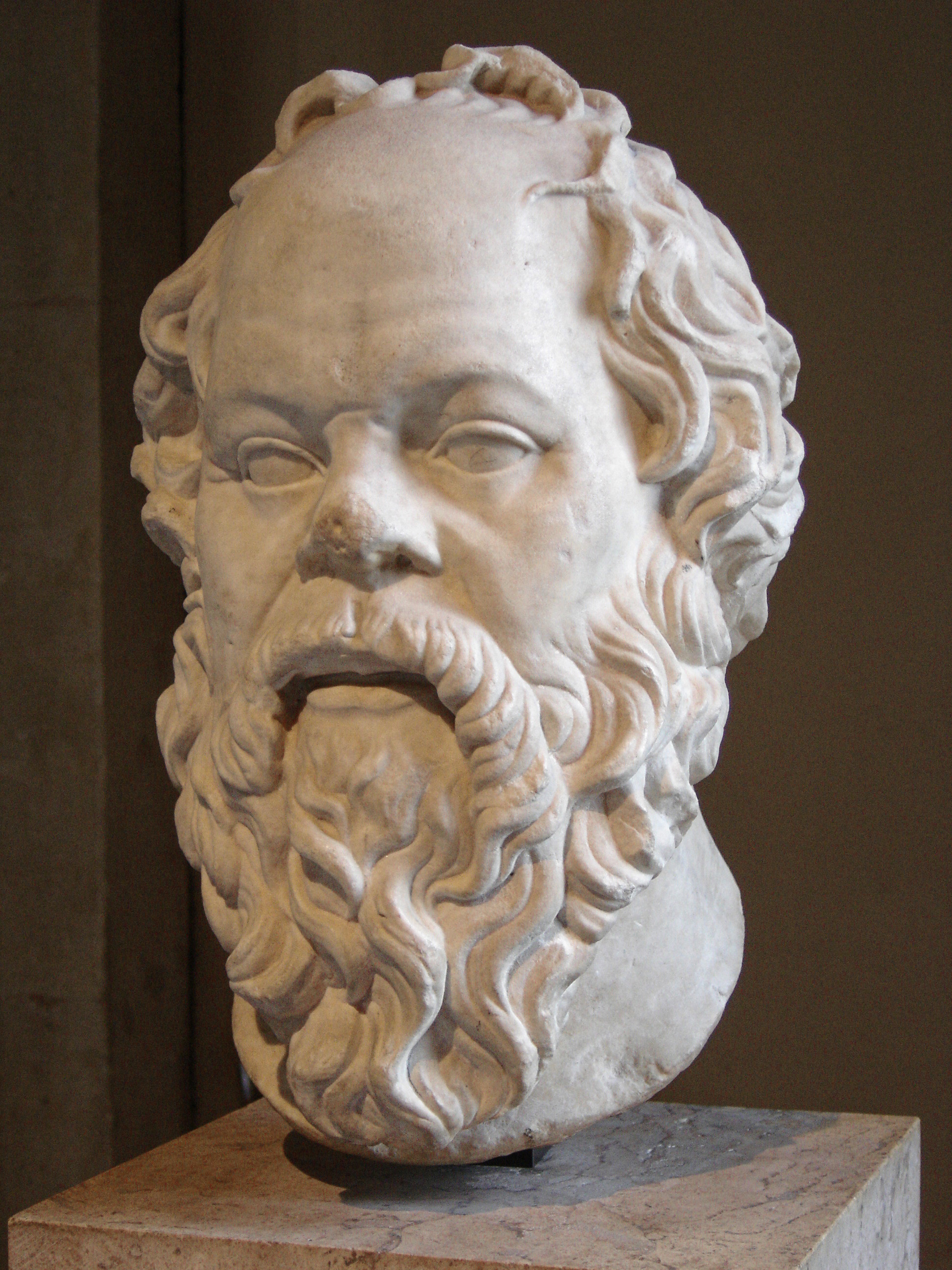
Portrait head of Socrates

According to Diogenes Laërtius, the order of Socrates' marriages to Myrto and Xanthippe was disputed in antiquity, with different authors holding that either he married Myrto first, or Xanthippe first, or that he was married to both simultaneously. (Note: J. W. Fitton argues that Diogenes mistakenly attributes the view that Socrates married first Xanthippe and then Myrto; he argues that the ancient dispute was in fact between those who held that Socrates married first Myrto and then Xanthippe, and those who held that he conducted the relationships simultaneously.) As several sources say that Myrto was the mother of Socrates' younger sons, Sophroniscus and Menexenus, she cannot have been the wife of Socrates before Xanthippe; however in the Phaedo Plato notes Xanthippe's presence when Socrates was imprisoned before his execution, so nor can Myrto have been Socrates' wife after Xanthippe. Thus Lévystone argues that Socrates had simultaneous relationships with Myrto and Xanthippe.

Both Athenaeus and the Suda describe both Myrto and Xanthippe as legitimate wives of Socrates; other sources use the more ambiguous term "gyne" which can mean both "wife" and "woman" and can refer to less formal relationships than marriage. Two ancient scholars, Satyrus the Peripatetic and Hieronymus of Rhodes, apparently referred to an Athenian decree which legalised bigamous relationships when discussing Socrates' dual relationships with Myrto and Xanthippe. In the form quoted by Diogenes Laertius, however, the decree merely recognises children born from two Athenians as eligible for citizenship, regardless of whether they were legally married, and does not legalise bigamy. Several sources, especially those derived from Aristoxenus of Tarentum's Life of Socrates, suggest that Myrto was the legitimate wife; Aristoxenus apparently considered Xanthippe to be Socrates' mistress.

The historicity of Myrto's relationship with Socrates was questioned in antiquity at least as early as Panaetius in the second century BC. The grounds for Panaetus' doubt do not survive, but Robert Cromey suggests that he argued that the relationship between Socrates and Myrto was based on confusion with Socrates' student Socrates the Younger. Despite this, the tradition of Socrates' bigamy was widely accepted from the medieval period onwards. Since the nineteenth century, scholars have frequently doubted the historicity of Socrates' marriage to Myrto. For instance Debra Nails believes that Xanthippe was the only wife of Socrates, accepting the version of the story recorded by Plutarch, that Socrates "took Myrto under his protection when she was widowed because she was poor and lacking in the necessities of life" as plausible. Since the 1970s, some scholars have begun to accept it again. Scholars such as J. W. Fitton, Peter J. Bicknell, and David Lévystone have argued that it was in fact Myrto who was the legitimate wife of Socrates. Alternatively Luis Navia accepts that Xanthippe was Socrates' wife while allowing for the possibility that Myrto was a second, common law wife.

== Works cited ==
- Bicknell, P. J. (1974). "Sokrates' Mistress Xanthippe". Apeiron: A Journal for Ancient Philosophy and Science. JSTOR 40913336.
- Cromey, Robert D. (1980). "Sokrates' Myrto". Grazer Beiträge. 9.
- Fitton, J. W. (1970). ""That was no lady, that was..."". Classical Quarterly. 20 (1). JSTOR 637508.
- Huffman, Carl (2012). Aristoxenus of Tarentum. New Brunswick, N.J: Transaction Publishers. ISBN 978-1-315-08215-8. OCLC 777330122.
- Lévystone, David (2025). "The Myrto Enigma: A Wife on the Side". In Araújo, Carolina (ed.). Women in the Socratic Tradition.
- Nails, Debra (2002). The People of Plato: A Prosopography of Plato and Other Socratics. Hackett. ISBN 978-0-87220-564-2.
- Navia, Luis (1985). Socrates: The Man and his Philosophy.
- Woodbury, Leonard (1973). "Socrates and the Daughter of Aristides". Phoenix. 27 (1).
