= Socrates (sculpture) =

Sculpture by W V Casey

- Artist: W. V. Casey
- Year: c. 1950
- Type: Bronze
- Dimensions: 51 cm × 33 cm × 15 cm (20 in × 13 in × 6 in)
- Location: Butler University; Indianapolis, Indiana, United States; 39.844670°N 86.170540°W
- Owner: Butler University

Socrates is an outdoor sculpture by artist W. V. Casey created c. 1950. The work is on the grounds of Butler University in Indianapolis, Indiana, United States. The sculpture depicts the Greek Athenian philosopher Socrates. In 1993 the sculpture was examined by the Save Outdoor Sculpture! program produced by the Smithsonian Institution.

== Description ==
A bronze sculpture placed on a limestone tablet (104 x 48 x 10 in.), Socrates is a portrait mask of the Greek Athenian philosopher Socrates. He is depicted as being bald and with a beard. To the lower left of the beard is engraved: W.V. CASEY and below the bronze bust on the tablet is inscribed:

SOCRATES
UNTIL PHILOSOPHERS ARE KINGS, OR THE
KINGS AND PRINCES OF THIS WORLD HAVE
THE SPIRIT AND POWER OF PHILOSOPHY...
THEN ONLY WILL THIS OUR STATE HAVE A
POSSIBILITY OF LIFE AND BEHOLD THE
LIGHT OF DAY.

The piece is installed as part of "Philosopher's Bench" at Butler University's Holcomb Gardens. The tablet is placed in the center of a small landscaped area with and has flanked by two benches which feature quotes by Socrates, Thomas Jefferson, Jesus Christ, Jean-Jacques Rousseau and Mohandas Gandhi.

== Creation ==
The work was created by W. V. Casey and dedicated circa 1950.

== Condition ==
In 1993 the piece was surveyed as part of the Smithsonian Institution's Save Outdoor Sculpture! survey. At the time of survey, the piece was described as needing treatment.
