= Socrates (Voltaire) =

Play by Voltaire

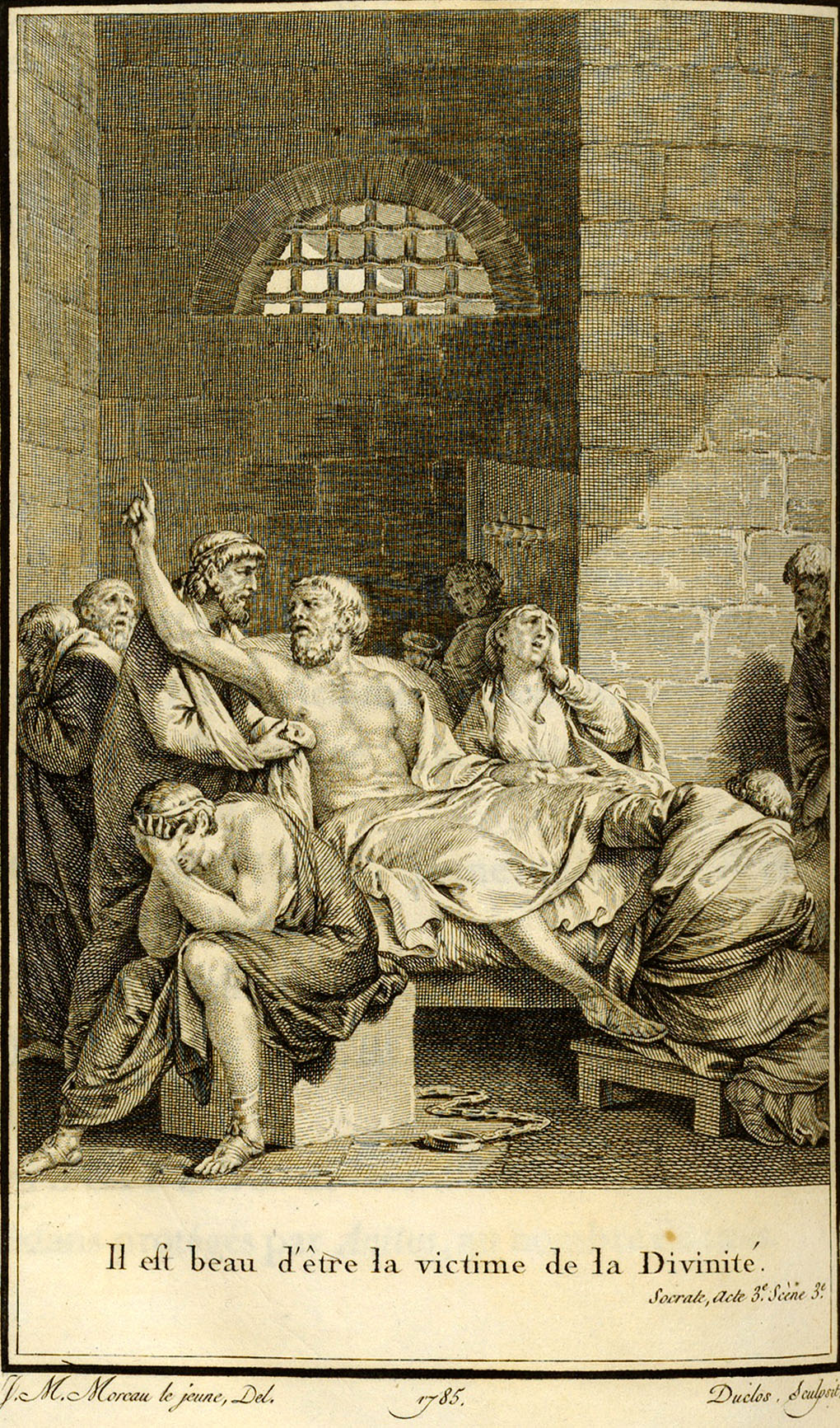
Jean-Michel Moreau's engraving of Socrates saying "Il est beau d'être la victime de la Divinité" ("'Tis noble to be the victim of the deity") in Act III, Scene iii

Socrates (French: Socrate) is a 1759 French play in three acts written by Voltaire. It is set in Ancient Greece during the events just before the trial and death of Greek philosopher Socrates. It is heavy with satire specifically at government authority and organized religion. The main characters besides the title role is that of the priest Anitus, his entourage, Socrates' wife Xantippe, several judges, and some children Socrates has adopted as his own.

Like more historical accounts by Herodotus, Plato, and Xenophon, the playwright shows Socrates as a moral individual charged with baseless accusations by a conspiracy of corrupt Athenians or Athenian officials although Voltaire implies that the wrongdoers are a select few.

Unlike the historical account, Socrates deals with several judges, whereas his real life counterpart receives his punishment of death by hemlock by a jury of 500 Athenians. The presence or mention of Socrates' best-known students such as Plato, Antisthenes, Aristippus, and others are replaced by unnamed disciples, delivering only a few token lines at the end of the play. Socrates is also portrayed as a monotheist and a victim of religious persecution, an interpretation that is not generally shared by modern scholars and historians.

Generally, this is not the most well-known of his works in comparison with Letters on the English which Voltaire published in 1734 or the Dictionnaire philosophique published earlier in 1764. However, hints of his contempt for government and religion are apparent here which later influenced the leaders of the American Revolution and the French Revolution.

== Characters ==
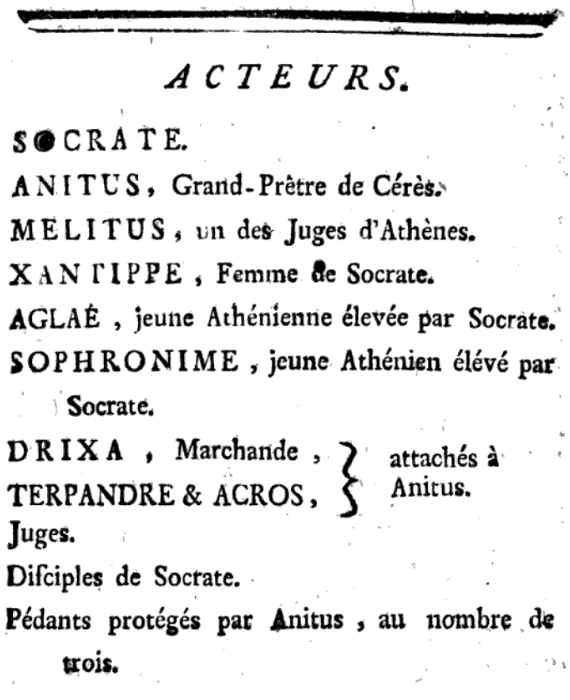
Dramatis personae in a 1770 edition

The play calls for the following characters. English versions of their names sometimes vary slightly.

- Socrates (Socrate)
- Anitus — High Priest of Ceres
- Melitus (Mélitus) — an Athenian judge
- Xantippe — Socrates' wife
- Aglae (Aglaé) — young Athenian girl raised by Socrates
- Sophronimus (Sophronime) — young Athenian boy raised by Socrates
- Drixa — merchant, friend to Anitus
- Terpander (Terpandre) — friend to Anitus
- Acros — friend to Anitus
- Judges
- Disciples of Socrates
- Nonoti, Chomos, Bertios — three pedants protected by Anitus

The characters Nonoti, Chomos, and Bertios were added in 1761. During Voltaire's lifetime, their names were published as Grafios, Chomos, and Bertillos, translated as Graphius, Chomus, and Bertillus; their names were first changed in the 1784 Kehl edition. The names Nonoti, Chomos, and Bertios are meant to be reminiscent of Voltaire's enemies Claude-Adrien Nonnotte, Abraham Chaumeix and Guillaume-François Berthier.
