= De genio Socratis =

Work by Plutarch

De genio Socratis (Greek: Περί του Σωκράτους δαιμονίου Perí tou Sōkrátous daimoníou) is a work by Plutarch, part of his collection of works entitled Moralia.

== Title ==
The title refers to the daimon of Socrates; as the Latin equivalent of this term is genius, it is often rendered as On the Genius of Socrates. The word genius in this usage pertains to a vital energy (c.f. - élan vital) or spirit (spiritus) or nature of something.

== Contents ==
The progress of discussion specifically on the subject of Socrates-daimon is instigated by the description of an occurrence pertaining subjectively to this (i.e. the daimon vis-a-vis Socrates). The text begins with the words an Italian Pythagorean is waiting at a grave for a divine sign, by which the reader understands this to have the meaning; an individual waiting at a grave for a daimonion.

According to Plutarch, Sophroniscus was cautioned by someone, and thus perhaps imbued to stem his influence on Socrates as to his work (ergon), because he had been told of his son (Socrates) having a guardian spirit who would lead him in the best way (the right way).

== Responses ==
The myth of Timarchus of Chaeronea within the piece is thought to be an imitation of Plato's Myth of Er (a part of the larger work, known as the Republic).

It is noted that De genio Socratis is similar to Phaedo by Plato, in at least due to the fact that both works are concerned especially with the divine sign, that is the daimon, of Socrates.

Plutarch identified the daimon with the conscience.
