= Socrates, his two Wives, and Alcibiades =

Painting by Reyer van Blommendael

- Xanthippe Dousing Socrates
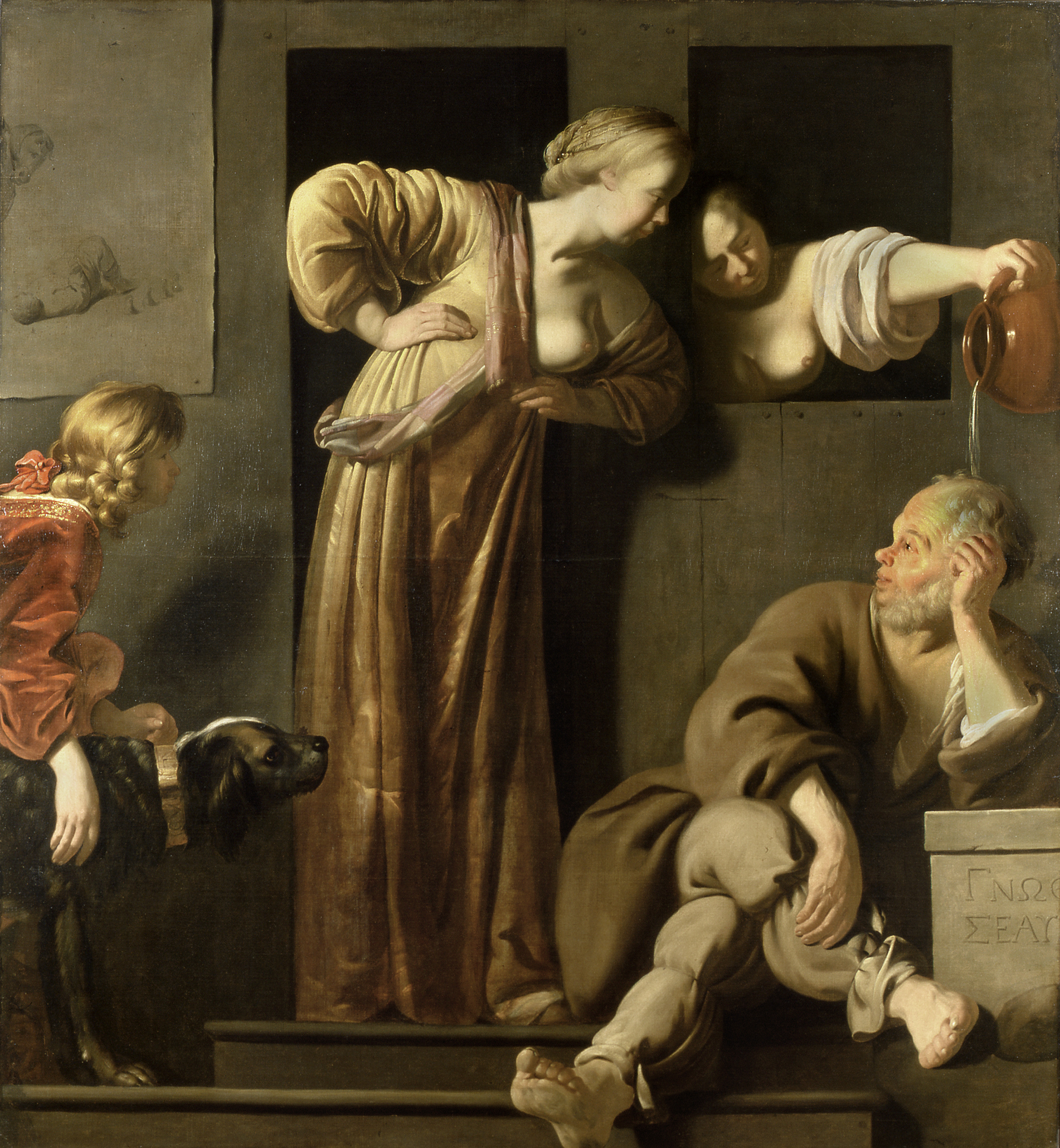
- Artist: Reyer van Blommendael
- Year: 1660s
- Medium: oil painting on canvas
- Movement: Baroque painting Christian art History painting
- Subject: Socrates, Xanthippe, Myrto, and Alcibiades
- Dimensions: 210 cm × 198 cm (83 in × 78 in)
- Location: Musée des Beaux-Arts, Strasbourg
- Accession: 1934

Socrates, his two Wives, and Alcibiades is a large oil on canvas painting by the Dutch Golden Age artist, Reyer van Blommendael. It is today owned by the Musée des Beaux-Arts of Strasbourg, France. Its inventory number is 1377.

The painting was bought in 1934 in Paris as a work by Jan Victors, and was later attributed to Cesar van Everdingen. Only in 1997 has the art historian Eddy de Jongh attributed the painting with certainty to Bloemmendael. Other paintings by Blommendael, especially Loth and his Daughters (Musée des Beaux-Arts of Dunkirk), show exactly the same, distinctive type of blonde, round-faced, small-eyed and full-breasted young woman as Socrates, his two Wives, and Alcibiades.

The bigamist Socrates is depicted as so absorbed by his thoughts that he remains ignorant of Myrto's erotic enticement, as well as of Xanthippe dousing him with cold water. Only young Alcibiades, arriving from the left, is about to waken the philosopher from his stupor. Socrates is leaning on a stone with the inscription "Know thyself".

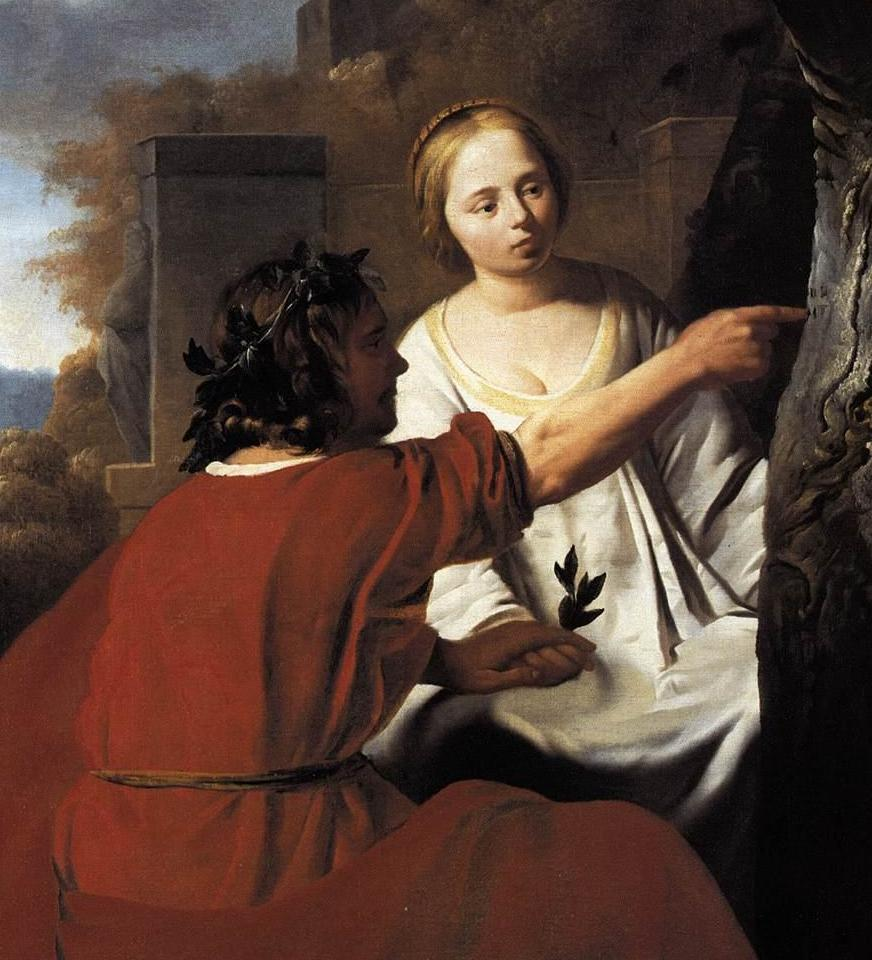
Paris and Oenone (detail), another painting by Bloemmendael featuring exactly the same type of woman as the Strasbourg painting.
