= Reyer van Blommendael =

Dutch Golden Age painter (1628–1675)

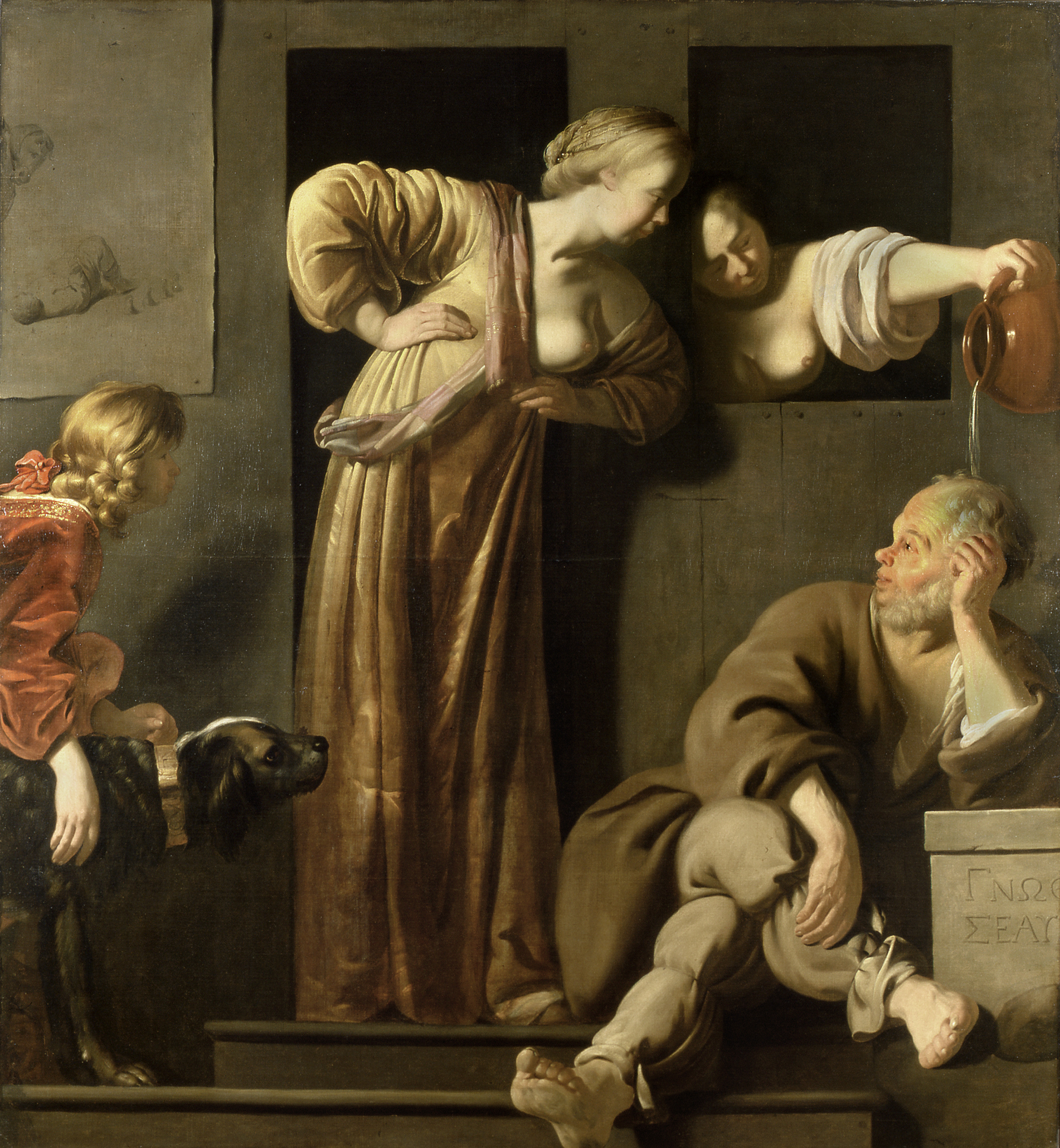
Socrates, his two Wives, and Alcibiades, painting from c. 1660–1670, now at the Musée des Beaux-Arts de Strasbourg.

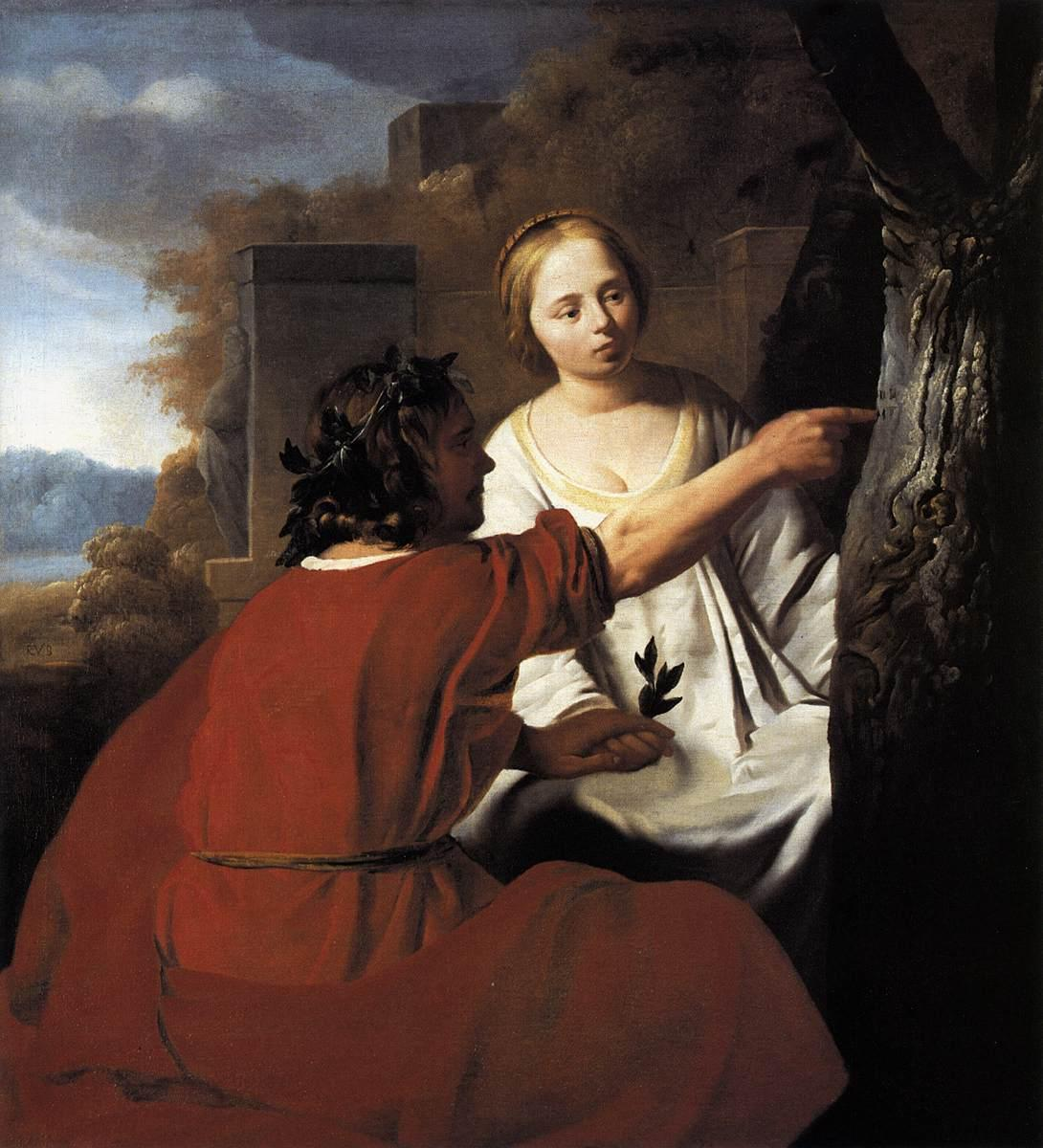
Paris and Oenone, now at the Palais des Beaux-Arts de Lille.

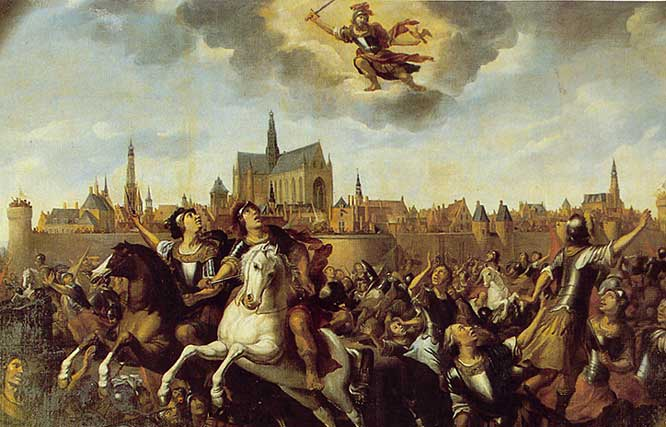
Saint Bavo Saves Haarlem

Reyer Jacobsz van Blommendael (27 June 1628 (baptised) – 23 November 1675) was a Dutch Golden-Age painter from Haarlem.

== Biography ==
He entered the Haarlem Guild of St. Luke in 1662, and was buried in the Grote Kerk, Haarlem, where his sister Risje (who had previously named him in her will) was later also buried. His sister's will of 1669 stated that he was living in Amsterdam, and her later will dated 1675 mentions him living in The Hague.

== Works ==
- Paris and Oenone, Palais des Beaux-Arts de Lille
- Lot and His Daughters, Musée des Beaux-Arts de Dunkerque
- Socrates, his two Wives, and Alcibiades (1660s), Musée des Beaux-Arts de Strasbourg
- Saint Bavo Saves Haarlem (1673), Grote Kerk, Haarlem
