= Chaerephon =

5th-century BC Greek philosopher

Chaerephon (/ˈkɛrəfən, -ˌfɒn/; Ancient Greek: Χαιρεφῶν, Chairephōn; c. 470/460 – 403/399 BCE), of the Athenian deme Sphettus, was an ancient Greek best remembered as a loyal friend and follower of Socrates. He is known only through brief descriptions by classical writers and was "an unusual man by all accounts", though a man of loyal democratic values.

== Life ==
Chaerephon is mentioned by three writers of his time, all of whom were probably well acquainted with him: Aristophanes, Xenophon, and Plato. Considered together, these sources suggest that Chaerephon was a well-known, alert, energetic, engaging individual, possibly with a distinctive physical appearance and probably a bit of a "character", who moved easily in the social and intellectual circles of the day.

=== In Aristophanes ===
Chaerephon appears in three of Aristophanes' comic plays: The Clouds, The Wasps, and The Birds. The Clouds, produced in 423 BCE, portrays Socrates and his assistant Chaerephon as a pair of charlatans operating a pseudo-scientific school in Athens. Chaerephon is represented in The Clouds as pale and malnourished, a "living corpse", and it is sometimes inferred that he must have been a thin, unhealthy looking fellow in real life. In The Wasps Chaerephon, or some visual caricature of him, has a brief, non-speaking role as an impartial witness. In The Birds he is nicknamed "the bat", possibly alluding to nocturnal habits, a bony appearance, or a sudden, excitable nature (as suggested in Plato's works, below).

=== In Xenophon ===
In his Memorabilia Xenophon includes Chaerephon in his list of the "true companions" of Socrates. Also in the Socratic inner circle, according to Xenophon, were Crito, Hermogenes, Simmias of Thebes, Cebes of Thebes, Phaedondes, and Chaerephon's younger brother Chaerecrates, although Xenophon acknowledges that there were others. Later in the Memorabilia, Xenophon recounts an exchange between Socrates and Chaerecrates on the occasion of a falling-out between the brothers. Socrates argues persuasively that Chaerecrates should make every effort to achieve a prompt reconciliation with his older brother Chaerephon.

=== In Plato ===
In Plato's Apology, an account of the Trial of Socrates in 399 BCE, Socrates calls Chaerephon his longtime friend and the friend of many present. Socrates says that Chaerephon is now deceased but indicates that his brother is in attendance at the trial. Socrates suggests that Chaerephon had a reputation for being impetuous and we learn that it was Chaerephon who journeyed to Delphi to ask the Delphic oracle who was the wisest of men. (The oracle replied that there was none wiser than Socrates.) Socrates also alludes to a period of exile which was endured by Chaerephon and some others present. This is sometimes taken as evidence that Chaerephon, unlike Socrates, was an active supporter of the Athenian Democracy and was persecuted on this account when the democracy was temporarily deposed after the defeat of Athens by Sparta.

Chaerephon appears in three other Platonic dialogues: the Charmides, the Gorgias, and the Halcyon. At the start of the Charmides, Socrates returns to Athens from the military campaign at Potidaea and is greeted with great enthusiasm by Chaerephon who is described as "a wild man". This campaign concluded in 430 BCE (3 years before Plato's birth and 31 years before Socrates' death), but Plato is probably accurate in depicting the association of Chaerephon and Socrates as already well established. At the start of the Gorgias, Chaerephon and Socrates arrive late at an Athenian gathering for an evening of conversation with Gorgias, a famed Sophist. Socrates good-naturedly blames their lateness on Chaerephon, who chatted too long in the Agora. Chaerephon then says that Gorgias is a friend of his and, with some coaching by Socrates, he serves satisfactorily as Gorgias' initial interlocutor in the early part of the dialogue.

== See also ==
- List of speakers in Plato's dialogues

== Sources ==
- Guthrie, W. K. C. (1971). Socrates. Cambridge University Press. ISBN 0-521-09667-7.
- Nails, Debra (2002). The People of Plato: A prosopography of Plato and other Socratics. Hackett Publishing Company. ISBN 0-87220-564-9. See pp 86–87.
