= Crito of Alopece =

5th-century BC Athenian philosopher

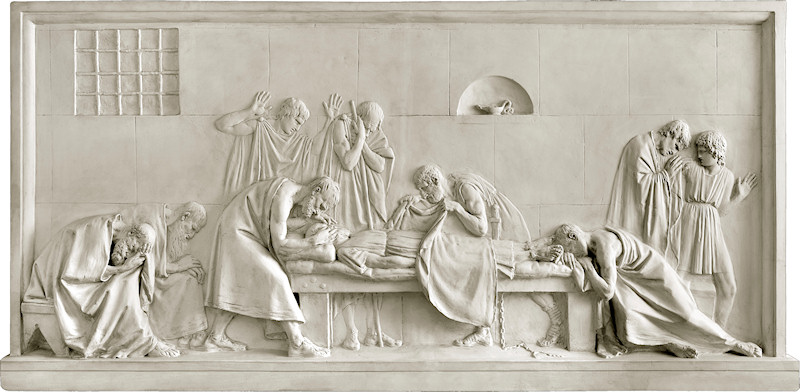
Crito of Alopece, fourth from left, closes the eyes of his deceased friend Socrates in a late 18th-century bas-relief piece by Italian sculptor Antonio Canova.

Crito of Alopece (/ˈkraɪtoʊ/ KRY-toh or /ˈkriːtoʊ/ KREE-toh; Ancient Greek: Κρίτων Ἀλωπεκῆθεν, gen.: Κρίτωνος, Kríton Alōpekēthen; c. 469 – 4th century BC) was an ancient Athenian agriculturist depicted in the Socratic literature of Plato and Xenophon, where he appears as a faithful and lifelong companion of the philosopher Socrates. Although the later tradition of ancient scholarship attributed philosophical works to Crito, modern scholars do not consider him to have been an active philosopher, but rather a member of Socrates' inner circle through childhood friendship.

== Life ==
Crito grew up in the Athenian deme of Alopece alongside Socrates and was of roughly the same age as the philosopher, placing his year of birth around 469 BC. Plato's Euthydemus and Xenophon's Memorabilia both present him as a wealthy businessman who made his money from agriculture, which scholars speculate was conducted in Alopece itself. He seems to have married a woman with impressive aristocratic pedigree and had at least two sons, including the elder Critobulus (Κριτόβουλος, Kritóboulos), one of Socrates' young followers, and the younger Archestratus (Άρχέστρατος, Archéstratos), later a successful general. His participation in the events surrounding the trial and death of Socrates in 399 BC implies that he survived into the 4th century BC.

Diogenes Laërtius treats Crito as a philosopher himself and attributes to him the composition of 17 dialogues; he also names three further sons of Crito: Hermogenes, Epigenes and Ctesippus. Modern scholars generally treat Diogenes' account as apocryphal, most likely a conflation with another author, since the genre of Socratic literature did not develop until well after Crito's period of flourishing and these sons appear nowhere in the contemporaneous historical record. Despite his strong friendship with Socrates, historians are skeptical of Crito's status as a philosopher, as opposed to mere associate within the Socratic circle, due largely to his portrayal as a pragmatic and non-propositional thinker within the literature.

== In literature ==
Crito is depicted prominently by Plato in the Euthydemus, the Phaedo, and his own eponymous dialogue, and also receives mention in the Apology. Xenophon portrays him in his Memorabilia and Symposium.

According to the dialogue which bears his name, Crito had grown up as a friend of Socrates, which is reinforced by their intimacy in the Euthydemus. In the Apology and Phaedo, Plato portrays Crito as present at the trial and execution of Socrates, attending to the familial and practical matters having to do with the philosopher's death. In addition to offering help with paying a proposed fine at Socrates' sentencing, Crito swore before Socrates' judges that the philosopher would remain in prison until the execution rather than attempt to flee Athens; he is nonetheless portrayed in his eponymous dialogue as urging Socrates to allow him and the Thebans Simmias and Cebes to bribe the prison guards so that Socrates might flee to Thessaly to seek asylum with his friends. During Socrates' final hours, Crito serves as a valet to his final needs and is the last individual to whom he speaks: Socrates asks him to offer a sacrifice to the Greek god Asclepius.

Though Xenophon counts Crito in the small circle of genuine associates of Socrates, neither Xenophon nor Plato portrays Crito as very philosophically inclined. Plato's Crito makes clear that he had participated in more than one philosophical conversation with Socrates; he is however depicted there and in the Phaedo as forgetful and inattentive to fundamental Socratic tenets. His concerns in the latter are entirely practical, in contrast to those of Socrates' other friends who are eager to share the philosopher's last hours in deep philosophical debate. In the Euthydemus, Crito frequently expresses disinterest in the work of philosophers, although Xenophon depicts Crito as urging his sons to follow Socrates.

Diogenes Laërtius also preserves a traditional story that Crito had released Phaedo of Elis, later a Platonic philosopher, from slavery.

=== Critobulus in literature ===
Critobulus also became a recurrent character within Socratic literature: according to the Apology and Phaedo, Critobulus offered to help Socrates pay his potential fine, and was present at the latter's execution. Xenophon depicts Socrates as chastising the supposedly otherwise moderate Critobulus for kissing "the beautiful son of Alcibiades" in a conversation in his Memorabilia. In the Telauges of Aeschines Socraticus, Socrates appears to have criticized Critobulus for his ignorance and ostentation, though only fragments of the dialogue survive.

== List of works ==
Diogenes Laërtius tells that Crito wrote 17 dialogues, although modern scholars assume that these are apocryphal and that Crito in fact did not write.

- That men are not made good by instruction
- Concerning superfluity
- What is expedient, or The Statesman
- Of Beauty
- On Doing Ill
- On Tidiness
- On Law
- Of that which is Divine
- On Arts
- Of Society
- Of Wisdom
- Protagoras, or The Statesman
- On Letters
- Of Poetry
- Of Learning
- On Knowing, or On Science
- What is Knowledge

== See also ==
- List of speakers in Plato's dialogues

== Bibliography ==
=== Ancient sources ===
- Diogenes Laërtius, Lives of the Eminent Philosophers.
- Plato, Apology, Crito, Euthydemus, Phaedo.
- Xenophon, Memorabilia, Symposium.

=== Modern sources ===
- Will Durant, The Story of Philosophy: the Lives and Opinions of the Greater Philosophers, New York, Simon & Schuster, 1926–1933.
- Debra Nails, The People of Plato, Indianapolis and Cambridge, Hackett Publishing, 2002.
