= Eristic =

Argumentation for the sake of winning the argument instead of reaching or seeking truth

In philosophy and rhetoric, eristic (from Eris, the ancient Greek goddess of chaos, strife, and discord) refers to an argument that aims to successfully dispute another's argument, rather than searching for truth. According to T.H. Irwin, "It is characteristic of the eristic to think of some arguments as a way of defeating the other side, by showing that an opponent must assent to the negation of what he initially took himself to believe." Eristic is defined by Rankin as arguing for the sake of conflict, as opposed to resolving conflict.

== Use in education ==
Eristic was a type of "question-and-answer" teaching method popularized by the Sophists, such as Euthydemos and Dionysiodoros. Students learned eristic arguments to "refute their opponent, no matter whether he [said] yes or no in answer to their initial question".

Plato contrasted this type of argument with dialectic and other more reasonable and logical methods (e.g., at Republic 454a). In the dialogue Euthydemus, Plato satirizes eristic. It is more than persuasion, and it is more than discourse. It is a combination that wins an argument without regard to truth. Plato believed that the eristic style "did not constitute a method of argument" because to argue eristically is to consciously use fallacious arguments, which therefore weakens one's position.

Unlike Plato, Isocrates (often considered a Sophist) did not distinguish eristic from dialectic. He held that both lacked a "'useful application' ... that created responsible citizens", which unscrupulous teachers used for "enriching themselves at the expense of the youth."

== Philosophical eristic ==
Schopenhauer considers that only logic pursues truth. For him, dialectic, sophistry, and eristic have no objective truth in view, but only the appearance of it; he believed that they do not seek truth itself but, rather, victory. He names these three last methods as "eristic dialectic (contentious argument)."

According to Schopenhauer, Eristic Dialectic is mainly concerned to tabulate and analyze dishonest stratagems, so that they may at once be recognized and defeated, in order to continue with a productive dialectic debate. It is for this very reason that Eristic Dialectic must admittedly take victory, and not objective truth, for its selfish aim and purpose.

== Argumentation theory ==
Argumentation theory is a field of study that asks critical questions about eristic arguments and the other types of dialogue.

== See also ==
- The Art of Being Right
- Logical fallacy
- Eris (mythology)
