= OSAP (disambiguation) =

OSAP may refer to:

- Ontario Student Assistance Program
- Aleppo International Airport
- Office of Systems, Analyses and Planning, part of the National Energy Technology Laboratory
- Oxford Studies in Ancient Philosophy
