= Alexander Long (disambiguation) =

Alexander Long may refer to:

- Alexander Long, Democratic United States Congressman
- Alex Long, British philosopher
- Alexander Long (rower), British rower
