= Crito =

Platonic dialogue concerning justice and injustice

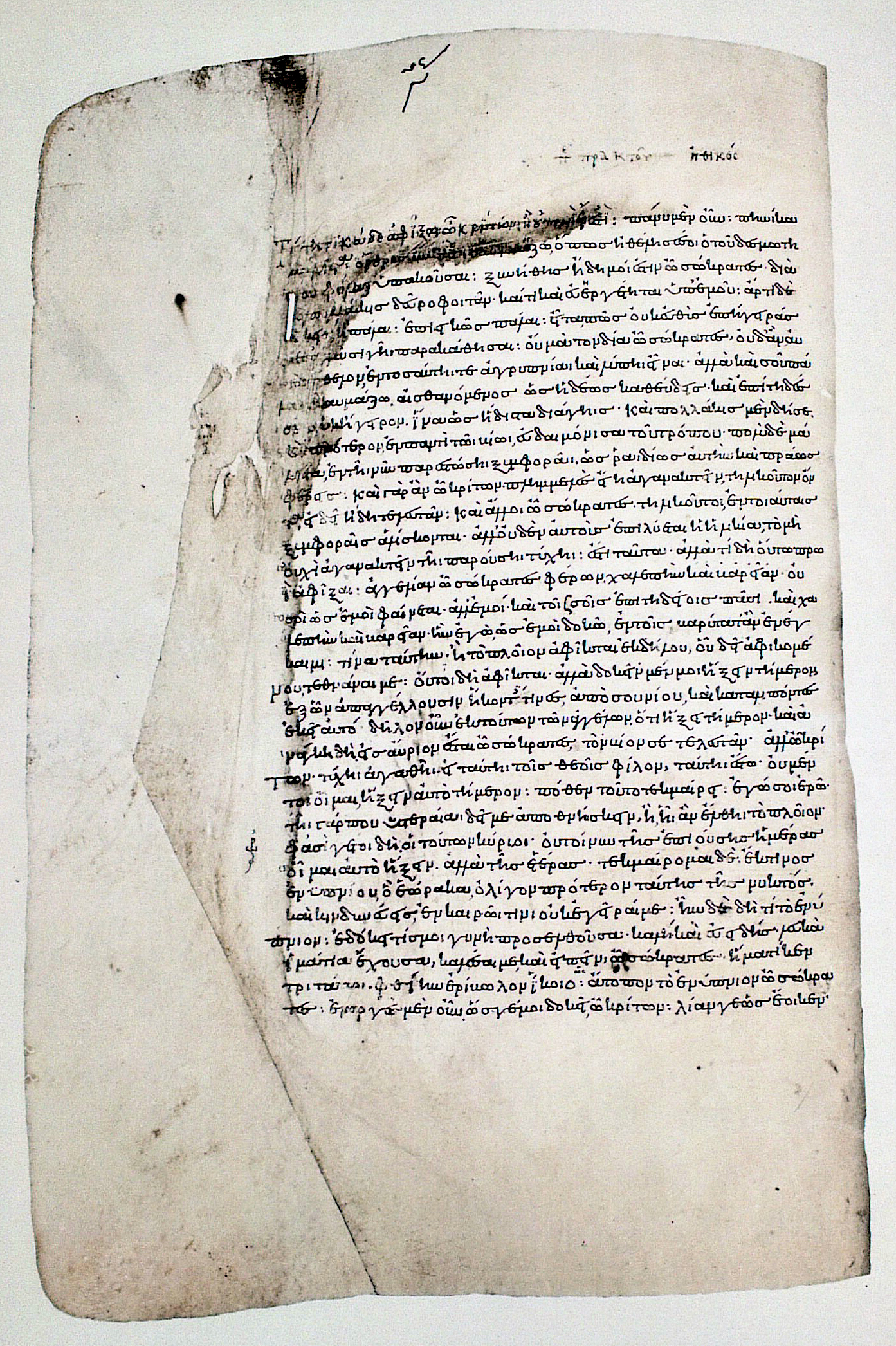
Beginning of Crito in the Codex Oxoniensis Clarkianus 39 of the Bodleian library (dating from around 895).

Crito (/ˈkraɪtoʊ/ KRY-toh or /ˈkriːtoʊ/ KREE-toh; Ancient Greek: Κρίτων [krítɔːn]) is a dialogue written by the ancient Greek philosopher Plato. It depicts a conversation between Socrates and his wealthy friend Crito of Alopece regarding justice (δικαιοσύνη), injustice (ἀδικία), and the appropriate response to injustice. It follows Socrates' imprisonment, just after the events of the Apology.

In Crito, Socrates believes injustice may not be answered with injustice, personifies the Laws of Athens to prove this, and refuses Crito's offer to finance his escape from prison. The dialogue contains an ancient statement of the social contract theory of government. In contemporary discussions, the meaning of Crito is debated to determine whether it is a plea for unconditional obedience to the laws of a society. The text is one of the few Platonic dialogues that appear to be unaffected by Plato's opinions on the matter; it is dated to have been written around the same time as the Apology.

== Setting ==
This dialogue takes place in 399 BC, in a prison cell, roughly a month after the events of the Apology, where Socrates has been found guilty of impiety by the Athenian jury.

=== Characters ===
The speakers in this dialogue are:

- Socrates of Alopece
- Crito of Alopece - a friend of Socrates, roughly the same age.

Other characters mentioned:

- Simmias and Cebes of Thebes

=== Background ===
Following his trial in the Apology, Socrates had been imprisoned for four weeks and would be executed in a matter of days. Historians are not aware of the exact location of Socrates' cell but according to archaeologists, the ancient Athenian prison is about 100 meters (330 ft) southwest of the Heliaia court, just outside the site of the agora.

Plato's representation of Socrates is a literary work, so the historical validity of what was said and how much of Plato's interpretation of Socrates aligns with his real beliefs is uncertain. According to Xenophon, Plato's friends drafted escape plans. The extent the theoretical plan aligned with the historical ones is unknown. Some historians of philosophy assume the Socratic figure depicted in Crito is similar to the historical figure. William K. C. Guthrie considers the social contract to be true to Socrates' philosophical interests.

== Dating and authorship ==
In research published in 2009, Holger Thesleff doubted Crito's authenticity. However, Crito is widely considered to be a genuine dialogue, generally one of the "early" dialogues.

== Summary ==
Crito has come to see Socrates because he has learned his execution will take place the next day, and wishes to rescue his friend. Crito has planned to bribe all of the guards who are part of the execution and assures Socrates he has enough money to see the plan through and that he has additional friends who are also willing to pay. After being rescued from prison, Socrates would be taken to a home in Thessaly, where Crito and his friends would be pleased to house and feed him. Crito asserts that if Socrates is executed, Crito will suffer a personal misfortune through the loss of a great friend. Crito also says if Socrates is executed, his sons will be deprived of the privileges to which the sons of a philosopher would be entitled—a proper education and living conditions. He also points out that when one takes on the responsibility of having children, it is immoral to abandon that duty. Additionally, if Socrates did not go with them, it will reflect poorly upon Crito and his friends because people would believe they were too miserly to save Socrates. Crito also claims that it is important that they consider the thoughts of the majority as they "can inflict … the greatest evils if one is slandered among them". Finally, Crito argues that Socrates should not worry about the potential punishments that he and his conspirators could face as they feel that the risk is worth taking.

After hearing Crito's arguments, Socrates asks to be allowed to respond with a discussion of related, open-ended issues. Socrates first says the opinions of the educated should be taken into consideration and that the opinions of those with subjective biases or beliefs may be disregarded. Likewise, the popularity of an opinion does not make it valid. Socrates uses the analogy of an athlete listening to his physician rather than his supporters because the physician's knowledge makes his opinion more valuable. According to Socrates, damage to the soul in the form of injustice makes life worthless for a philosopher in the same way life for a person who has injured himself out of incompetence is pointless. A person's goal should be to live a virtuous and just life rather than a long one: thus escape from the prison would rely on a discussion on justice. Socrates disregards Crito's fears of a damaged reputation and his children's futures, which are irrelevant to him. He compares such motivations to a person who sentences someone to death and then regrets the action. Socrates then says Crito and his friends should know better because they have shared the same principles for a long time and that abandoning them at their age would be childish. To wrong the state, even in reaction to an injustice, would be an injustice.

Socrates then points out the question would then be whether he should harm someone or ignore a just obligation. To solve this question, Socrates asks Crito to imagine justifying the decision to escape Athens before the laws and the state themselves, as if they could speak directly. According to Socrates, the laws would argue a state cannot exist without respect for its rules. They would criticise Socrates for believing he and every other citizen had the right to ignore court judgements because chaos could ensue. If Socrates were to accept Crito's offer, he would be known as someone who exposed his accomplices to the risk of fleeing or losing their assets. As a fugitive in a well-established state, good citizens would be suspicious of Socrates because he would be suspected of violating the laws in his place of exile, so he would have to live somewhere chaotic and disorganised, and where he could only entertain crowds with the story of his unjust escape. As a philosopher who had become unfaithful to his principles, he would be discredited and would have to give up his previous life content and his sense of life would only be through food. In conclusion, if Socrates accepts his execution, he will be wronged by men rather than the law, remaining just. If he takes Crito's advice and escapes, Socrates would wrong the laws and betray his lifelong pursuit of justice.

After Socrates concludes this exposition, he likens the conviction he has to the Korybantes, who seem to hear the music of their flutes to the exclusion of all else, and asks Crito to rebuff him if he wishes. Crito has no objections.

== Reception ==
=== Ancient ===
The Epicurean philosopher Idomeneus of Lampsacus claimed that the escape plan came from Aeschines of Sphettus rather than Crito, and that the names were transposed because Aeschines was not favored by Plato.

Roman philosopher and politician Cicero interpreted Crito to mean citizens are obliged to serve the state out of gratitude.

The philosopher Athenaeus said Crito serves as Plato's means of attacking the real-life Crito; because Crito showed no philosophical ability, his inability to present a proper argument is to be expected.

=== Medieval ===
The oldest manuscript of Crito was produced in 895 CE in Byzantium. In the Latin-speaking world, Crito was an unknown work but the Islamic world had produced translations of it for years.

=== Renaissance ===
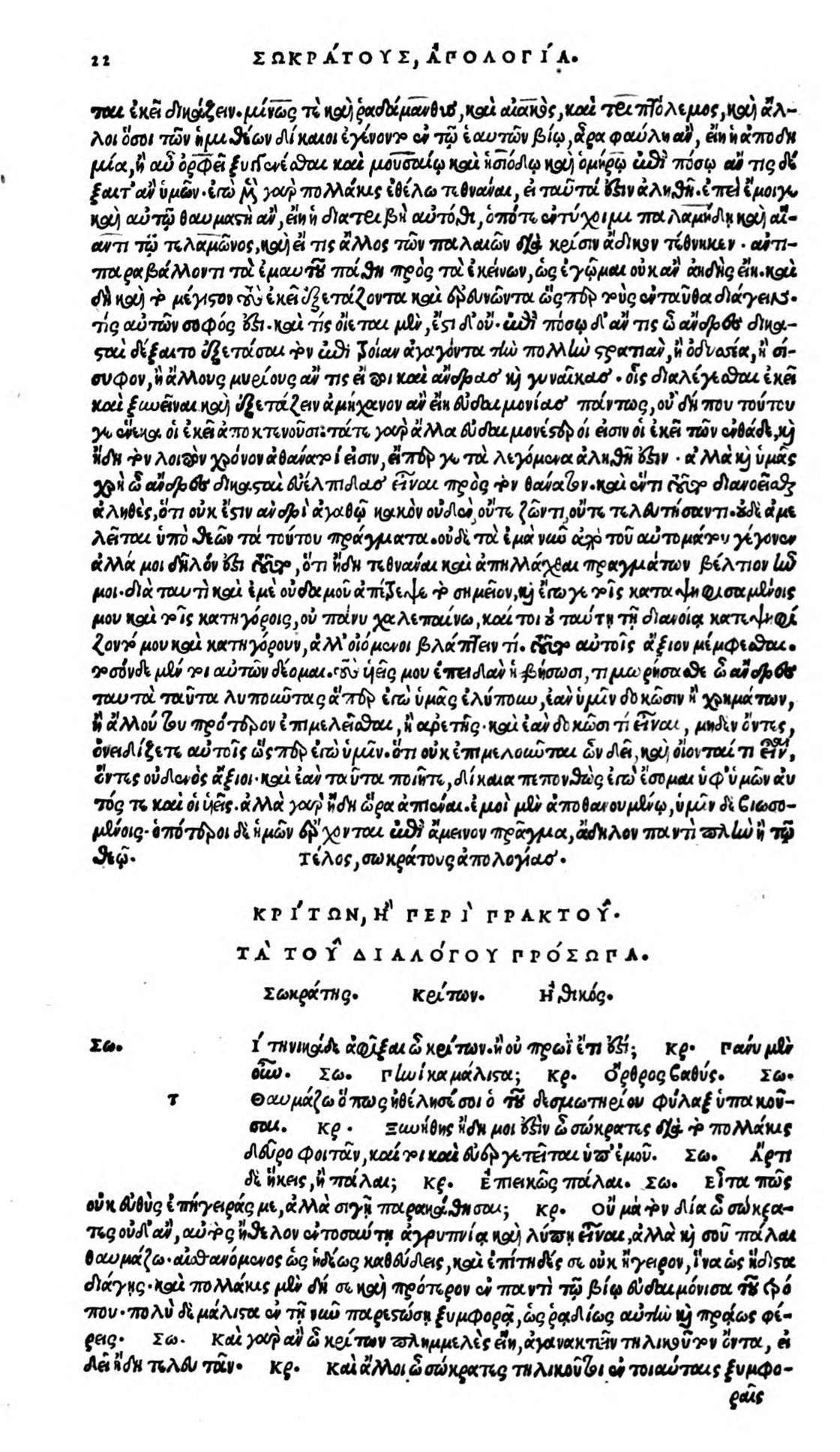
The beginning of Crito, as printed in the first edition by Aldo Manuzio.

Crito first became available in Western Europe during the age of Renaissance humanism. The first Latin translation was made in 1410 by the Italian humanist and statesman Leonardo Bruni, who was not satisfied with this translation and worked upon another that was completed by 1427. Bruni was so satisfied with the arguments presented by the Laws that he had used them in his own work, De militia. A revision of Bruni's Latin translation was created by Rinuccio da Castiglione. Marsilio Ficino was the third humanist translator; he published the translation in Florence in 1484. The first edition of the Greek text was published in September 1513 in Venice by Aldo Manuzio in the complete edition of Plato's works, which was published by Marcus Musurus.

=== Modern ===
==== Philosophical aspects ====
The philosopher David Hume (1711–1776) made reference to Crito as the only ancient text that holds the idea of a citizen's implicit promise of loyalty. He said Plato's Socrates founded the social contract in the manner of Whigs and influences passive obedience as seen from the Tories.

The philologist Ulrich von Wilamowitz-Moellendorff found no philosophical content in Crito. According to him, the dialogue teaches "about the duty of the citizen, but not in the abstract, rather Socratic; Athenian". Gabriel Danzig states the text presents Socrates as an "embarrassingly obedient and dutiful citizen"; in doing so, Plato wanted to justify him "to the good citizens who did not care about philosophy".

Danzig added that in contemporary specialist literature, Plato is considered to be only concerned with making Socrates understandable to his readers rather than philosophically presenting and justifying universal principles. Olof Gigon saw the dialogue as a light work that is welcoming to aspiring philosophers. Despite this, the work was regarded as a key Western parallel to Legalism according to philosopher Reginald E. Allen. Hellmut Flashar argued that despite its initial appearances, Crito's depth can be discerned through dialogue and that in doing so, it may be revealed as a difficult text.

In modern discussions of law and order, the responsibilities of citizens to follow rules unconditionally has many commonalities with Crito's presentation of Crito's lenient understanding of the Laws and Socrates' rigid one. According to Flashar, attempting to apply modern ideas to Platonic philosophy estranges the themes.

According to Austrian philosopher Karl Popper, the representation of Socrates in Crito is the quintessential version of him and the piece may have been a request by Socrates himself. In tandem with the Apology, Socrates' last will may be formed. Socrates, who was convicted as an Athenian, chose not to flee Athens because of his virtue as an Athenian and the loyalty to the state that follows. If he chose to go into self-exile as Crito had suggested, he would undermine the fundamental system the state he pledges allegiance to was based upon. Peter Sloterdijk said Crito is one of the "initial texts of philosophy par excellence" with which Plato founded "a new way of looking for the truth". Crito was the defender of this world against the death of his master. He played a "half ridiculous, half moving role". For Socrates, life was a lesson so he consequently "turned his last breath into an argument and his last hour into evidence".

== Philosophical implications ==
In the Crito, unlike Plato's other works, Socrates takes a more objective stance on epistemology, being optimistic about the knowledge coming from experts in a subject.

=== Authoritarianism ===
One of the most controversial issues raised by Crito is the presentation of a society in which citizens who are incapable of changing laws by convincing lawmakers have to abide by the laws to remain "just". The state's demand for loyalty was a social contract theory in which citizens have a mutual agreement with the state and understand what being a citizen of the state entails. A person only became a citizen after undertaking a test called dokimasia (δοκιμασία); citizenship was not conferred at birth. Those who do not want to live under such laws are to emigrate if they desire an ethical life. Although Socrates ultimately rejects the idea of expulsion, he believes it to be ethical because the court had suggested it and because the ruling was unjust. It followed, however, from the overall context of Platonic ethics in the sense that it prioritises the avoidance of injustice.

Sandrine Bergès proposed a Liberal interpretation of the law in which the agreement between the state and the individual implies a mutual obligation. The legislation provides the citizens' livelihoods and an environment conducive to their prosperity and so they consider themselves to be loyal to the laws. Prosperity, in the sense of Socrates, means the formation of character – the acquisition of virtue as a prerequisite for a good life. In this sense, the analogy of the relationship between parent and child is to be understood as parents having the obligation to educate their children to be good people and can expect their children's obedience in return. The laws promote the virtue of citizens and should therefore be respected. In both cases, the parent entity must fulfil its obligation to be eligible for obedience. In the relationship between Socrates and the Athenian laws, this was the case despite the judgement of the court. If it was otherwise, there would be no obligation to comply with the laws.

According to Richard Kraut, the laws require a serious effort to command respect. If this attempt was to fail, civil disobedience would be permissible. A number of critics, however, argue this could not be inferred from the text; rather, in the event of a failure of the conviction attempt, unconditional obedience to the law was demanded. According to David Bostock, the authoritarian concept is the exact view Plato wanted to convey in Crito, but in later works Plato recognized the problems with this position and modified his point of view. A number of other commentators support the traditional interpretation that the position of the Laws was to identify with the Platonic Socrates. Defenders of the piece say that this view ignores the possibility that the arguments' weaknesses are inherent to the dialectical process.

Although Socrates presents this authoritarian argument to Crito, this does not mean he agrees with the conclusion, only the result; the refusal to flee. According to Verity Harte, when Socrates compares himself at the end of the dialogue to the "Corybants who seem to hear the flutes", this shows that Socrates decision to stay was an irrational aspect that contrasts with the philosophical demand for unconditional reason. According to Roslyn Weiss, Socrates presents an authoritarian argument in favor of respecting the law rather than a reasoned argument because Crito could not follow Socrates' philosophical argument. Thomas Alexander Szlezák also said the justification for Socrates' attitude towards his friend is emotional rather than not philosophically demanding because it is inevitably based on Crito's level of reflection. The crucial point for Socrates is in the Phaedo dialogue rather than Crito. Socrates in Crito avoids using the word "soul" – a concept that is introduced and discussed in various dialogues – and dealt with a metaphysically neutral paraphrase, apparently because Crito does not accept the philosophical assumption of an immortal soul.

=== Lawfulness and ethical autonomy ===
Multiple researchers have claimed that there is a purposeful rhetorical incongruity between the Apology and Crito from Plato's representation of Socrates' dialogues. In the Apology, Socrates explained that he would not obey a hypothetical court verdict that forced him to renounce public philosophising on pain of death, for such a demand would be an injustice to him.

Michael Roth claimed that there was no inconsistency, and that the real in Crito and the hypothetical in the Apology were two fundamentally different systems to be held to different standards. According to another solution, Socrates' argument in the Apology was of a purely theoretical nature, since a prohibition of philosophy had no legal basis and no situation was conceivable in which the court could have actually imposed such a penalty on Socrates, unless the defendant had proposed this himself.

Italian historians of philosophy Mario Montuori and Giovanni Reale used chronological distance to explain this difference: that The Apology and the Crito were written at different times and for different reasons. In the Apology — which was the younger work — Plato essentially reported what Socrates had said without much embellishment, but when writing Crito, he had given his thoughts on the matter through the mask of Socrates.

On the other hand, if Socrates' punishment could not occur, professor of morality Necip Fikri Alican argued that Socrates could not simply just be using meaningless thought experiments. Philosophy professor James Stephens simply believed the problem has no solution.

=== Non-retaliation ===
Greogry Vlastos argued that in the Crito, Socrates proposes a principle of non-retaliation because it is a form of harm against oneself and hurts those who engage in it.

Socrates: "For doing evil to people is the same thing as wronging them."

Crito: "That is true."

Socrates: "Then we ought neither to requite wrong with wrong nor to do evil to anyone, no matter what he may have done to us."

== Texts and translations ==
- Greek text at Perseus
- Plato: Euthyphro, Apology, Crito, Phaedo, Phaedrus. Greek with translation by Harold N. Fowler. Loeb Classical Library 36. Harvard Univ. Press (originally published 1914).
- Fowler translation at Perseus
- Plato: Euthyphro, Apology, Crito, Phaedo. Greek with translation by Chris Emlyn-Jones and William Preddy. Loeb Classical Library 36. Harvard Univ. Press, 2017. ISBN 9780674996878 HUP listing
- Plato. Opera, volume I. Oxford Classical Texts. ISBN 978-0198145691
- Plato. Complete Works. Hackett, 1997. ISBN 978-0872203495
- The Last Days of Socrates, translation of Euthyphro, Apology, Crito, Phaedo. Hugh Tredennick, 1954. ISBN 978-0140440379. Made into a BBC radio play in 1986.

== See also ==
- The Republic
- Trial of Socrates
