= Euenus =

Ancient Greek poet

Euenus (or Evenus) of Paros, (Greek: Εὔηνος ὁ Πάριος), was a 5th-century BC poet who was roughly contemporary with Socrates.

Euenus is mentioned several times in Plato's Phaedo, Phaedrus, and Apology of Socrates. According to Maximus Tyre, Evenus was the instructor of Socrates in poetry, a statement which derives some countenance from a passage in Plato from which it may also be inferred that Euenus was alive at the time of Socrates's death, but at such an advanced age that he was likely soon to follow him. Eusebius places him at the 30th Olympiad (B. C. 460) and onwards. His poetry was gnomic, that is, it formed the vehicle for expressing philosophic maxims and opinions. The first six of the epigrams in the Greek Anthology which bear the name "Euenus" are of this character, and may therefore be ascribed to him with tolerable certainty. Perhaps, too, the fifteenth should be assigned to him.

== See also ==
- Simmias of Thebes
