= Phaedo of Elis =

4th-century BCE Greek philosopher

Phaedo of Elis (/ˈfiːdoʊ/; also, Phaedon; Ancient Greek: Φαίδων ὁ Ἠλεῖος, gen.: Φαίδωνος; fl. 4th century BC was a Greek philosopher. A native of Elis, he was captured in war as a boy and sold into slavery. He subsequently came into contact with Socrates at Athens, who warmly received him and had him freed. He was present at the death of Socrates, and Plato named one of his dialogues Phaedo.

He returned to Elis, and founded the Elean School of philosophy. Almost nothing is known of his doctrines, but his school survived him and was subsequently transferred to Eretria by his pupil Menedemus, where it became the Eretrian school.

== Life ==
Born in the last years of the 5th century BC, Phaedo was a native of Elis and of high birth. He was taken prisoner in his youth, and passed into the hands of an Athenian slave dealer; being of considerable personal beauty, he was forced into prostitution. The occasion on which he was taken prisoner was no doubt the war between Sparta and Elis, 402–401 BC, in which the Spartans were joined by the Athenians in 401 BC.

Two years would have been available for Phaedo's acquaintance with Socrates, to whom he attached himself. According to Diogenes Laërtius he was ransomed by one of the friends of Socrates. The Suda says that he was accidentally present at a conversation with Socrates, and pleaded with him to effect his liberation. Various accounts mention Alcibiades, Crito, or Cebes, as the person who ransomed him. Cebes is stated to have become friends with Phaedo, and to have instructed him in philosophy. Phaedo was present at the death of Socrates in 399 BC, and was young enough for Socrates to stroke his hair, which was worn long in the Spartan style.

That Phaedo was friends with Plato seems likely from the way in which he is introduced in Plato's dialogue Phaedo, which takes its name from him. Athenaeus, though, relates that Phaedo and Plato were enemies, and that Phaedo resolutely denied any of the views which Plato ascribed to him.

Phaedo appears to have lived in Athens for a short time after the death of Socrates. He then returned to Elis, where he became the founder of a school of philosophy. His disciples included Anchipylus, Moschus, and Pleistanus, who succeeded him. Subsequently Menedemus and Asclepiades transferred the school to Eretria, where it was known as the Eretrian school and is frequently identified (e.g. by Cicero) with the Megarian school.

== Works ==
The doctrines of Phaedo are not known, nor is it possible to infer them from the Platonic dialogue of which he is the namesake. His writings, none of which are preserved, were in the form of dialogues. As to their authenticity, nothing is known, in spite of an attempt at verification by Panaetius, who maintained that the Zopyrus and the Simon were genuine. Besides these Diogenes Laërtius mentions as of doubtful authenticity the Nicias, Medius, Antimachus or Elder, and Scythian Discourse. Some scholars believe that Phaedo's Simon dialogue created the character of Simon the Shoemaker.

The Suda also mentions the Simmias, Alcibiades, and Critolaus. Seneca has preserved one of his dicta, concerning the results of frequenting the company of good (or bad) people:

Phaedo says: "Certain tiny animals do not leave any pain when they sting us; so subtle is their power, so deceptive for purposes of harm. The bite is disclosed by a swelling, and even in the swelling there is no visible wound". That will also be your experience when dealing with wise people, you will not discover how or when the benefit comes to you, but you will discover that you have received it.

== See also ==
- List of speakers in Plato's dialogues
- List of slaves
