= Xanthippe =

Ancient Athenian, wife of Socrates

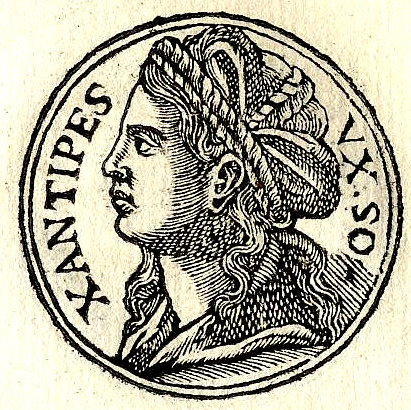
Portrait from Promptuarium Iconum Insigniorum (1553) by Guillaume Rouillé

Xanthippe (/zænˈθɪpi/; Ancient Greek: Ξανθίππη [ksantʰíppɛː]; fl. 5th–4th century BCE) was an ancient Athenian, the wife of Socrates and mother of their son Lamprocles; she may also have been the mother of his other sons Sophroniscus and Menexenus. She was likely much younger than Socrates, perhaps by around 30 years. In Xenophon's Symposium, she is described by Antisthenes as "the most difficult, harshest, painful, ill-tempered" wife; this characterisation of Xanthippe has influenced all subsequent portrayals of her.

== Life ==
Little is known about the life of Xanthippe. The ancient sources that mention her do so primarily to illustrate something about the character of Socrates, rather than provide any biographical information about Xanthippe. She was probably born around 440 BCE, (Note: Xanthippe's age is estimated from that of her children. Lamprocles, Socrates' eldest child, was approaching adulthood at the time of Socrates' death; the youngest, Menexenus, was still an infant or toddler. Debra Nails, who accepts Xanthippe as the mother of all three of Socrates' children, estimates her age at about 40 at this point, which puts her birthdate at c. 440 BC.) making her around 30 years younger than Socrates, who was born c. 470. Xanthippe's father may have been called Lamprocles, and Socrates and Xanthippe's eldest son been named after him; this may have been the Lamprocles mentioned by Aristophanes in the Clouds, who was a well-known musician in fifth-century Athens.

Xanthippe and Socrates apparently married after 423 BCE, as in Aristophanes' Clouds, first produced in that year, Socrates seems to be unmarried. She bore Lamprocles around 415 or 414 BCE. She may have been the mother of Socrates' other two children, Sophroniscus and Menexenus. Athenaeus and Diogenes Laertius both report versions of a story that Socrates married twice, once to Xanthippe and once to Myrto, the daughter or granddaughter of Aristides the Just. This story has generally not been believed by modern scholars, though some have accepted it – for instance J. W. Fitton, who argues that Myrto was Socrates' wife whereas Xanthippe was a citizen pallake ("concubine").

On the basis of her name (a compound of hippos, "horse", which often indicated a noble background) and the fact that her eldest son was, contrary to the usual Athenian practice, not named after Socrates' father, some scholars have suggested that she was from an aristocratic family. Fitton however notes that non-aristocratic Athenians with "hippos" names are known, and argues that though Xanthippe was an Athenian citizen she was not from an especially aristocratic family. Alternatively, David Lévystone argues that the naming of Lamprocles supports the interpretation that Myrto was Socrates' wife and Xanthippe only a concubine.

== Character ==
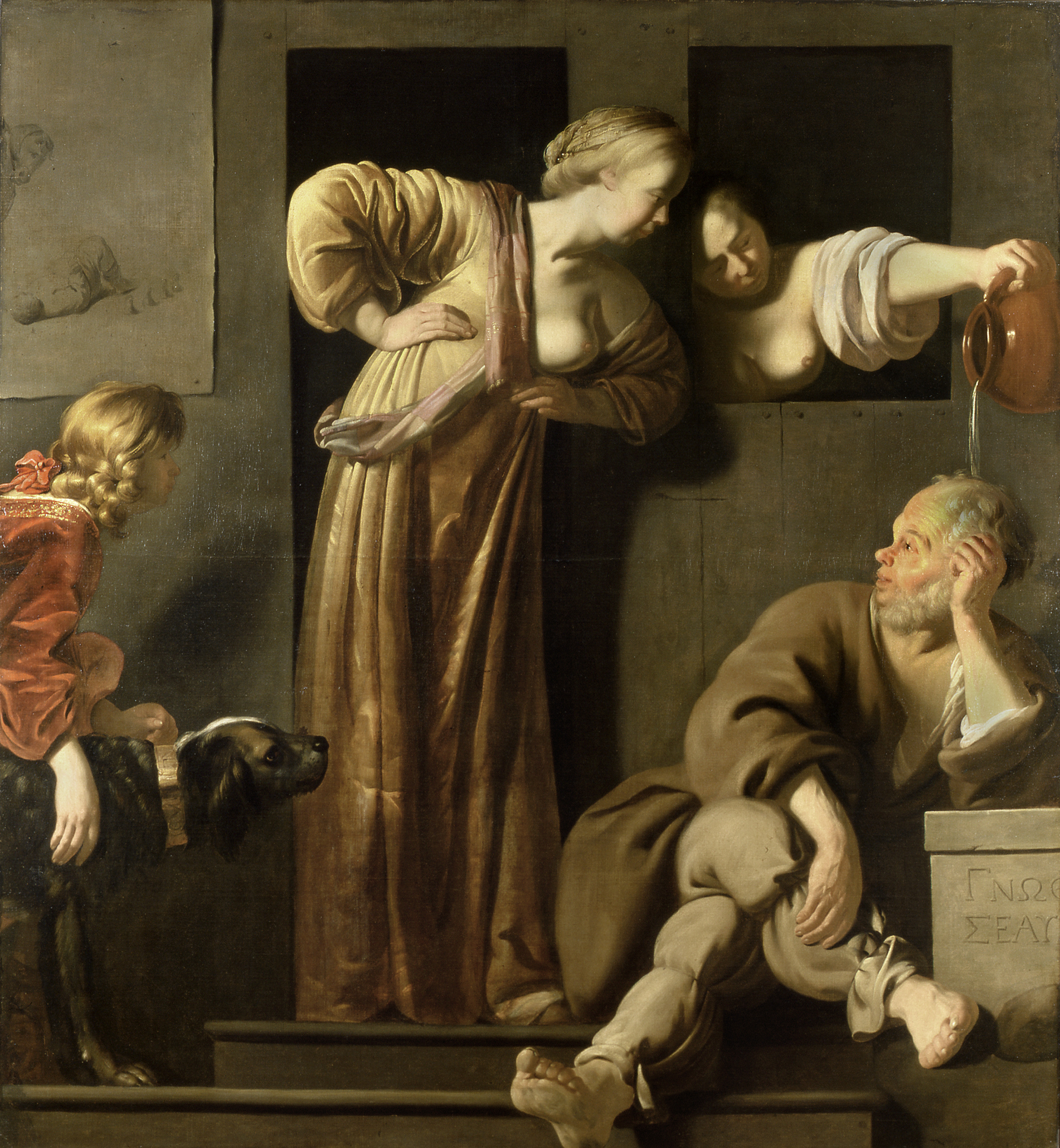
Socrates, his two Wives, and Alcibiades, by Reyer van Blommendael. Xanthippe douses her husband with cold water from a hydria.

Xanthippe is mentioned only once by Plato, in the Phaedo, depicted sitting by Socrates on the night before his execution. There is no evidence in Plato's portrayal of the shrewish Xanthippe of later tradition. The characterisation of Xanthippe as a difficult wife derives from Xenophon's depiction of her: in the Memorabilia, though she is not named her son Lamprocles complains of her harshness, and in Xenophon's Symposium, Antisthenes describes her as "the most difficult, harshest, painful, ill-tempered" wife. Socrates says that he chose her precisely because of her argumentative spirit:

It is the example of the rider who wishes to become an expert horseman: "None of your soft-mouthed, docile animals for me," he says; "the horse for me to own must show some spirit" in the belief, no doubt, if he can manage such an animal, it will be easy enough to deal with every other horse besides. And that is just my case. I wish to deal with human beings, to associate with man in general; hence my choice of wife. I know full well, that if I can tolerate her spirit, I can with ease attach myself to every human being else.

Later ancient authors, such as Diogenes Laertius, largely follow Xenophon's characterisation of her as a difficult wife. Several of the anecdotes reported by Diogenes serve to show Socrates' wit, and to contrast his temperament with that of his wife. In one story told by several ancient sources, Xanthippe pours a jug of water over Socrates' head; according to Diogenes he responded with the quip "Did I not say that thundering Xanthippe also makes water?"

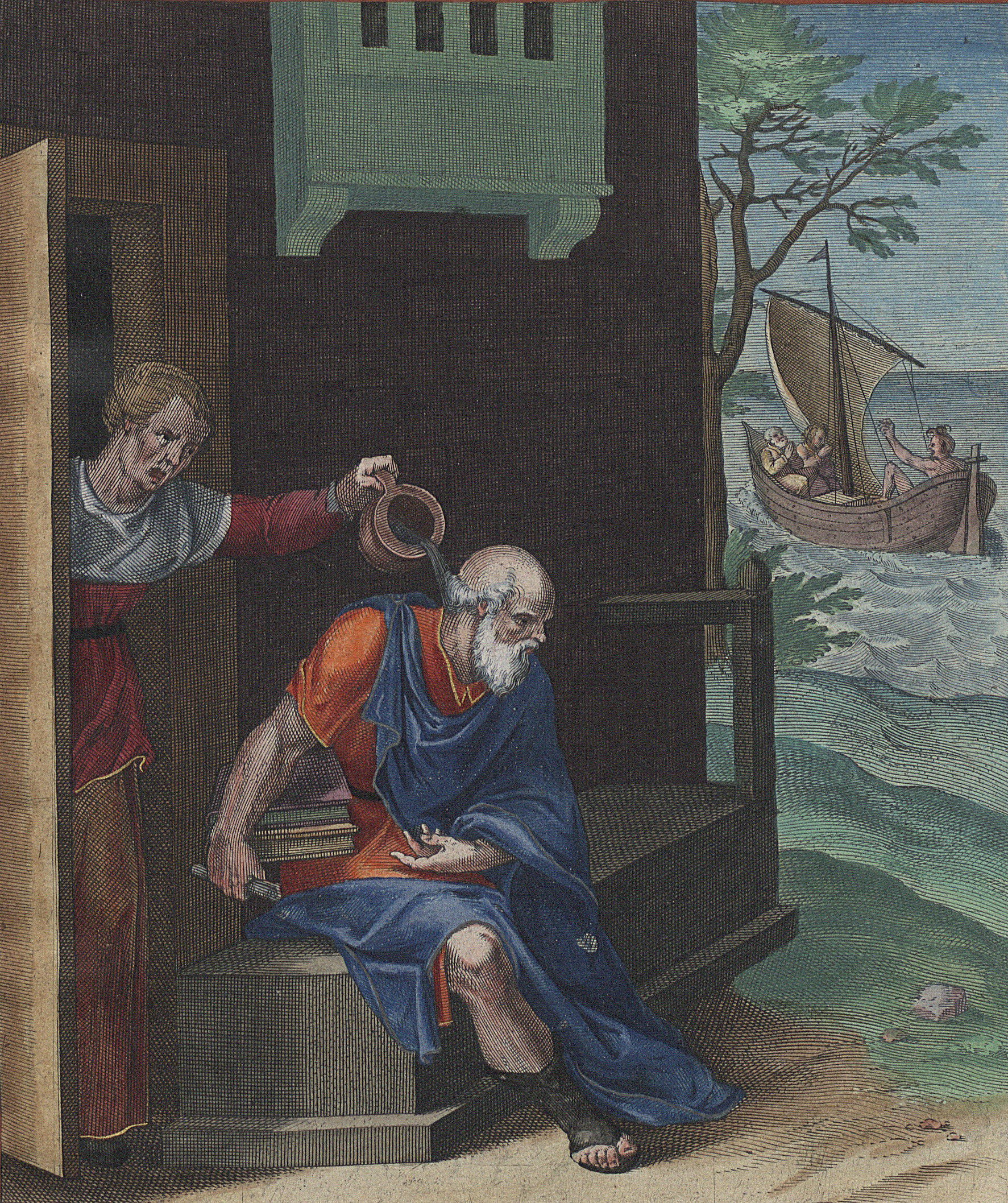
An emblem book print portraying Xanthippe emptying a chamber pot over Socrates, from Emblemata Horatiana illustrated by Otho Vaenius, 1607.

== Legacy ==
Medieval authors who mention Xanthippe largely repeat the ancient anecdotes about her, and follow the example of Xenophon and Diogenes Laertius in portraying her as a difficult wife. In the Wife of Bath's Tale, for example, Geoffrey Chaucer retells Diogenes' story of Xanthippe pouring a water-jug over Socrates' head, though in his version the jug is filled with urine. This story has also historically been popular with visual artists, and was widely depicted in the sixteenth and seventeenth centuries. The first positive portrayal of Xanthippe comes from the 1405 Book of the City of Ladies by Christine de Pizan: her version of Xanthippe attempts to save Socrates from death by taking the poison from him.

The negative portrayal of Xanthippe continued into the early-modern period. William Shakespeare, for instance, cites her as a proverbially bad wife in The Taming of the Shrew. During the Enlightenment, some followed in the tradition of a shrewish Xanthippe – such as Pieter Langendijk in his Xantippe, of het booze wyf des filozoofs Sokrates beteugeld. (The English translation of the Old Dutch title is "Xanthippe, or the Shrewish Wife of the Philosopher Socrates Tamed", reminiscent of Shakespeare's "The Taming of the Shrew".) Others, however, began to treat her more sympathetically: the German scholar Christoph August Heumann was the first to question the historicity of the negative ancient anecdotes about her.

From the 19th century, feminist authors have also portrayed Xanthippe sympathetically: for instance in the Victorian poet Amy Levy's poem Xanthippe: A Fragment. Some feminist portrayals of Xanthippe present her traditional assertiveness as a positive characteristic: in Cynthia Ozick's "Puttermesser and Xanthippe" the golem Xanthippe chooses that name in recognition of her own independence from her creator, as "Xanthippe alone had the courage to gainsay Socrates". In modern feminist thought, Xanthippe has been taken as emblematic of the history of women's subjugation. However, many modern portrayals of Xanthippe do continue to follow the negative tradition about her, such as in the 1970 film Socrates.

In his essay "The Case for Xanthippe" (1960), Robert Graves suggested that the stereotype of Xanthippe as a misguided shrew is emblematic of an ancient struggle between masculinity (rationality, philosophy) and femininity (intuition, poetry), and that the rise of philosophy in Socrates' time has led to rationality and scientific pursuit coming to exercise an unreasonable dominance over human life and culture.

== In popular culture ==
- Xanthippe has a fairly important role in Maxwell Anderson's 1951 play Barefoot in Athens. In the 1966 Hallmark Hall of Fame television production, she was played by Geraldine Page opposite Peter Ustinov as Socrates.
- A highly-positive, tongue-in-cheek account of Xanthippe as the intellectual inspiration behind Socrates and Aristotle is given in Roger Scruton's Xanthippic Dialogues (St Augustines Press, 1998). She reappears in the sequel, Perictione in Colophon (St Augustines Press, 1999).
- A fictional account of Xanthippe's relationship with her husband is presented in the play Xanthippe by the British author and playwright Deborah Freeman. Xanthippe was first produced at the Brockley Jack Theatre, London, in 1999.
- Xanthippe plays a minor role in the 2018 videogame Assassin's Creed: Odyssey, in which Socrates states that her argumentative nature is what attracted him to her, rather than her looks.

== Honours ==
Asteroid 156 Xanthippe is named in her honour.

In 1995, P. Naskrecki and R.K. Colwell gave the patronym Xanthippe to a genus of flower mite that inhabits flowers of palms of the genus Socratea and is probably phoretic on the beetles that pollinate the palm.

A species of African white-toothed shrew was described by Wilfred Hudson Osgood in 1910 as Crocidura xantippe, common name "Xanthippe's shrew."

== See also ==
- List of speakers in Plato's dialogues

== Works cited ==
- Bicknell, Peter (1974). "Socrates' Mistress Xanthippe". Apeiron. 8.
- Brickhouse, Thomas C.; Smith, Nicholas D. (1990). Socrates on Trial. Clarendon Press.
- Dickison, Sheila K. (1974). "The Insubordinate Wife in Greek Literature". Echos du monde classique: Classical news and views. xviii (3).
- Fitton, J. W. (1970). ""That was no lady, that was..."". Classical Quarterly. 20 (1). JSTOR 637508.
- Lévystone, David (2025). "The Myrto Enigma: A Wife on the Side?". In Araújo, Carolina (ed.). Women in the Socratic Tradition.
- Nails, Debra (2002). The People of Plato: A Prosopography of Plato and Other Socratics. Hackett. ISBN 978-0-87220-564-2.
- Saxonhouse, Arlene (2018). "Xanthippe: Shrew or Muse". Hypatia. 33 (4). JSTOR 45153718.
- Stavru, Alessandro (2025). "Xanthippe's Harshness: At the Root of Socrates' Endurance and Paideutic Mission". In Araújo, Carolina (ed.). Women in the Socratic Tradition.
- Strobl, Wolfgang (2015). "Xanthippe". Brill's New Pauly Supplements II Online: Volume 7. doi:10.1163/2468-3418_bnps7_SIM_004786.
- Woodbury, Leonard (1973). "Socrates and he Daughter of Aristides". Phoenix. 27 (1). JSTOR 1087907.
