= Karl Praechter =

German classical philologist (1858–1933)

Karl Praechter (17 October 1858, Heidelberg – 18 February 1933, Halle an der Saale) was a German classical philologist.

From 1877 he studied theology in Lausanne, followed by studies of classical philology at several German universities. He worked as a gymnasium teacher in the municipalities of Durlach and Bruchsal, and in 1889 obtained his habilitation in classical philology from the University of Bern. In 1899 he became a full professor at Bern, and later relocated to the University of Halle, where from 1907 to 1926, he served as a professor of classical philology.

== Published works ==
In 1909 he published the tenth edition of Friedrich Ueberweg's Grundriß der Geschichte der Philosophie, Teil 1: Die Philosophie des Altertums (Outline of the History of Philosophy, Volume 1: The Philosophy of Antiquity); often referred to as the "Ueberweg-Praechter". In 1919 he released a radically revised 11th edition, and in 1926 he published the 12th and final version of the "Ueberweg-Praechter". Other noteworthy writings by Praechter include:

- Cebetis Tabula quanam aetate conscripta esse videatur, 1885.
- Die griechisch-römische Popularphilosophie und die Erziehung, 1886 – The Greco-Roman popular philosophy and education.
- Kleine Schriften, 1892 – Minor works.
- Kebētos pinax = Cebetis Tabula, 1893 – On Cebes' "Tabula.
- Hierokles der Stoiker, 1901 – Hierocles the Stoic.
