= Ad personam =

Attacking an opponent's inherent identity rather than their arguments

In an argument, ad personam, short for argumentum ad personam, is a tactic aimed at discrediting one's opponent by attacking their personality, unrelated to the substance of the debate.

== Origin ==
In his treatise The Art of Being Right, the German philosopher Arthur Schopenhauer lists this technique under the title of Stratagem No. 38 (both last listed and last resort):

When we realise that the opponent is superior and that we will end up being defeated, become offensive and outrageous; that is, don't focus on the object of the dispute anymore, since it would be a fiasco, but focus directly on the opponent and try to attack them in any way. You could call this an argumentum ad personam, and you should distinguish it from the argumentum ad hominem; in fact, while in the latter we attack what the opponent has said or admitted, with this stratagem we leave the subject in question aside and rail against the opponent with insolence. It basically is an appeal to the more brutal forces that we have, and as anyone can put it into practice, it is certainly a widespread stratagem. In the event that our opponent starts to use this behaviour, we certainly cannot do the same, otherwise it would turn into a fight, a duel or a trial.

== Character and person ==
Ad personam and ad hominem are distinct. The former is a personal attack, unrelated to the subject matter of the debate, which aims to discredit the person of the opponent regardless of his arguments; the latter focuses on the argumentation, reasoning or behavior of the opponent in relation to the subject matter of the debate, rather than directly on the subject matter of the debate itself.

In his Manuel de Polémique, Stéphane Muras outlines the distinction between an argument concerning character (ad hominem) and an argument concerning personal attributes (ad personam). An ad hominem argument pertains to what the opponent has revealed about themselves, identifying an inconsistency between the thesis they are currently defending and a previous thesis, either through their words or through concrete and proven actions. This approach addresses the public figure's credibility. In contrast, an ad personam argument invokes the opponent's inherent identity, which does not involve a conscious decision. This includes factors such as their familial rank, position in a hierarchy, age, physical characteristics, geographical origin, or even zodiac sign.

=== Examples ===
- Argumentum ad hominem: "Hannah Arendt does not develop a philosophy to which one can refer: she had a relationship with a Nazi in the person of Martin Heidegger."
- Argumentum ad personam: When Gaétan Barrette first became Quebec's Minister of Health, many people attacked him for being overweight, regardless of his health policy. "An online petition launched by a Quebec entrepreneur, Pierre-Étienne Vachon, asking Dr. Barrette to lose weight was signed by 8,500 people. These people claimed that Gaétan Barrette could not be Minister of Health while being obese."
