= The Art of Being Right =

1831 treatise by Arthur Schopenhauer

The Art of Being Right: 38 Ways to Win an Argument
- Author: Arthur Schopenhauer
- Original title: Eristische Dialektik: Die Kunst, Recht zu behalten

The Art of Being Right: 38 Ways to Win an Argument (also The Art of Controversy, or Eristic Dialectic: The Art of Winning an Argument; German: Eristische Dialektik: Die Kunst, Recht zu behalten; 1831) is an acidulous, sarcastic treatise written by the German philosopher Arthur Schopenhauer. In it, Schopenhauer examines a total of thirty-eight methods of defeating one's opponent in a debate. He introduces his essay with the idea that philosophers have concentrated in ample measure on the rules of logic, but have not (especially since the time of Immanuel Kant) engaged with the darker art of the dialectic, of controversy. Whereas the purpose of logic is classically said to be a method of arriving at the truth, dialectic, says Schopenhauer, "... on the other hand, would treat of the intercourse between two rational beings who, because they are rational, ought to think in common, but who, as soon as they cease to agree like two clocks keeping exactly the same time, create a disputation, or intellectual contest."

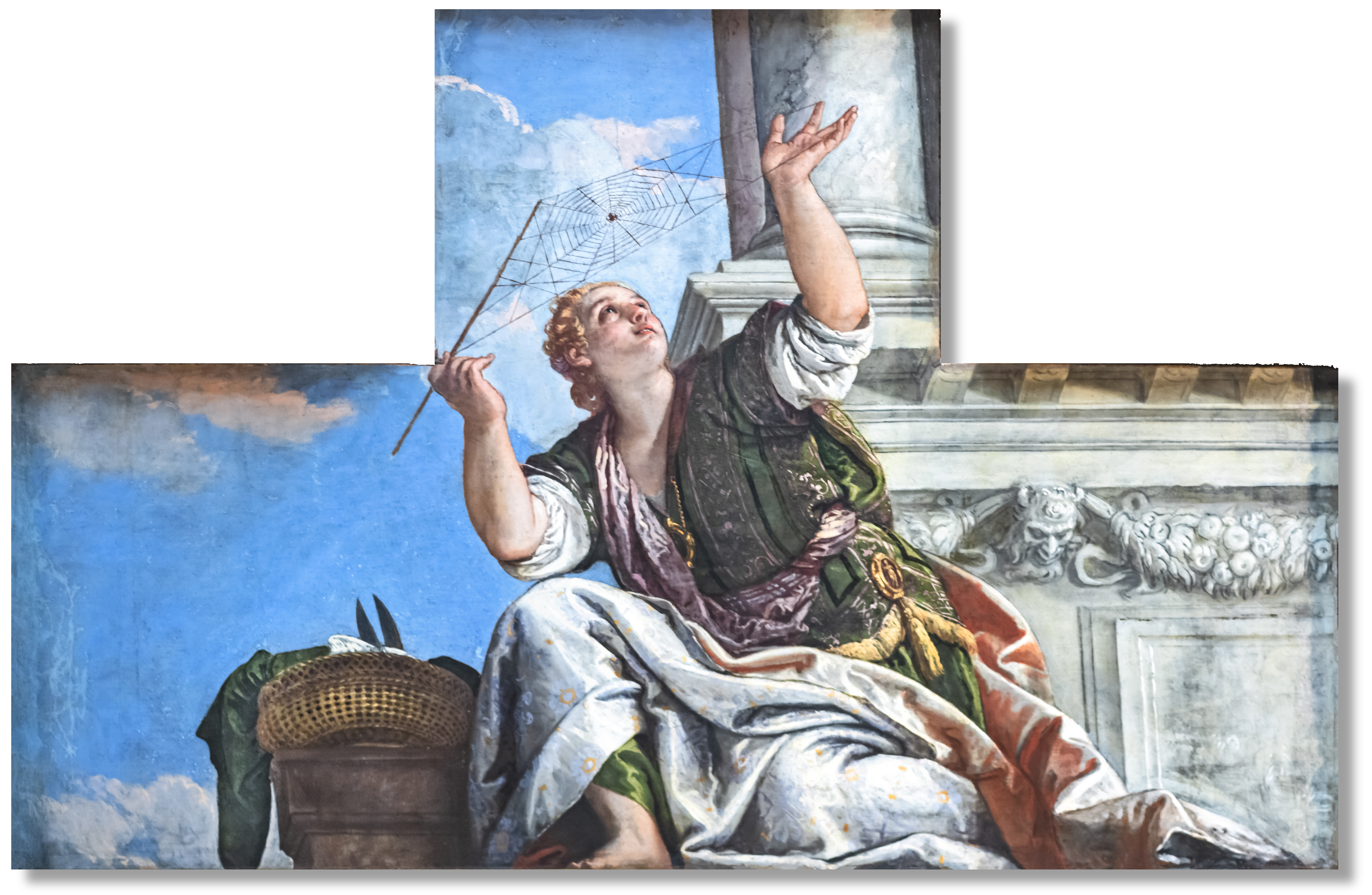
Paolo Veronese, Arachne or Dialectics, 1575

== Publication ==
Basis of all dialectic, according to Schopenhauer

In Volume 2, § 26, of his Parerga and Paralipomena, Schopenhauer wrote:

The tricks, dodges, and chicanery, to which they [men] resort in order to be right in the end, are so numerous and manifold and yet recur so regularly that some years ago I made them the subject of my own reflection and directed my attention to their purely formal element after I had perceived that, however varied the subjects of discussion and the persons taking part therein, the same identical tricks and dodges always come back and were very easy to recognize. This led me at the time to the idea of clearly separating the merely formal part of these tricks and dodges from the material and of displaying it, so to speak, as a neat anatomical specimen.

He "collected all the dishonest tricks so frequently occurring in argument and clearly presented each of them in its characteristic setting, illustrated by examples and given a name of its own." As an additional service, Schopenhauer "added a means to be used against them, as a kind of guard against these thrusts..."

However, when he later revised his book, he found "that such a detailed and minute consideration of the crooked ways and tricks that are used by common human nature to cover up its shortcomings is no longer suited to my temperament and so I lay it aside." He then recorded a few stratagems as specimens for anyone in the future who might care to write a similar essay. He also included, in Parerga and Paralipomena, Volume 2, § 26, an outline of what is essential to every disputation.

The Manuscript Remains left after Schopenhauer's death include a 46-page section on "Eristic Dialectics". It contains thirty–eight stratagems and many footnotes. There is a preliminary discussion about the distinction between logic and dialectics. E. F. J. Payne translated these notes into English.

A. C. Grayling edited T. Bailey Saunders' English translation in 2004.

== Synopsis ==
The following lists the 38 stratagems described by Schopenhauer, in the order of their appearance in the book:

1. The Extension
2. The Homonymy
3. Generalize Your Opponent's Specific Statements
4. Conceal Your Game
5. False Propositions (to be used for argumentum ex concessis)
6. Postulate What Has to Be Proved
7. Yield Admissions Through Questions
8. Make Your Opponent Angry
9. Questions in Detouring Order (a combination of leading questions and enthymeme)
10. Take Advantage of the Nay-Sayer (an application of reverse psychology)
11. Generalize Admissions of Specific Cases
12. Choose Metaphors Favourable to Your Proposition
13. Agree to Reject the Counter-Proposition
14. Claim Victory Despite Defeat (bluffing with logic similar to that of the Texas sharpshooter fallacy)
15. Use Seemingly Absurd Propositions
16. Arguments Ad Hominem
17. Defense Through Subtle Distinction (related to shifting the goalposts and distinction without a difference)
18. Interrupt, Break, Divert the Dispute
19. Generalize the Matter, Then Argue Against it
20. Draw Conclusions Yourself
21. Meet Him With a Counter-Argument as Bad as His
22. False claim of Petitio principii
23. Make Him Exaggerate His Statement
24. State a False Syllogism
25. Find One Instance to the Contrary
26. Turn the Tables
27. Anger Indicates a Weak Point
28. Persuade the Audience, Not the Opponent
29. Diversion
30. Appeal to Authority Rather Than Reason
31. This Is Beyond Me
32. Put His Thesis into Some Odious Category
33. It Applies in Theory, but Not in Practice
34. Don't Let Him Off the Hook
35. Will Is More Effective Than Insight
36. Bewilder Your Opponent by Mere Bombast
37. A Faulty Proof Refutes His Whole Position
38. Become Personal, Insulting, Rude

== See also ==
- Big lie
- Informal logic
- Logical fallacies
- Philosophical logic
- Reasoning
