= Oxford Studies in Ancient Philosophy =

- Discipline: Ancient philosophy
- Language: English

Publication details
- History: 1983–present
- Publisher: Oxford University Press (United Kingdom)

Standard abbreviations
- ISO 4: Oxf. Stud. Anc. Philos.

Links
- Journal homepage

Oxford Studies in Ancient Philosophy is a peer-reviewed academic journal devoted to the study of ancient philosophy. The journal is indexed by PhilPapers and the Philosopher's Index. Each volume however is assigned an ISBN on its own, and the volumes have been described as being rather more like an anthology than a journal issue.

Oxford Studies in Ancient Philosophy was started in 1983 by Julia Annas. At the time of its founding, it was commended as a supplement or even rival to the journal Phronesis. It was also criticized for using transliterations of the ancient Greek language texts rather than the original alphabet. It is one of the major journals for ancient philosophy. The journal is published by Oxford University Press and the current editor is Rachana Kamtekar at Cornell University. Apart from Annas, previous editors were Victor Caston, Brad Inwood, C. C. W. Taylor and David Sedley.
