= Menedemus =

Greek philosopher (345/44 – 261/60 BC)

Menedemus of Eretria (Ancient Greek: Μενέδημος ὁ Ἐρετριεύς; 345/44 – 261/60 BC) was a Greek philosopher and founder of the Eretrian school. He learned philosophy first in Athens, and then, with his friend Asclepiades, he subsequently studied under Stilpo and Phaedo of Elis. Nothing survives of his philosophical views apart from a few scattered remarks recorded by later writers.

== Life ==
Menedemus was born at Eretria. He was a member of the noble Theopropidai family, which held significant religious authority but had become impoverished by Menedemus's time. Like his father, Cleisthenes, he worked as a builder and tent maker.

In the course of military conflicts (probably 323/322 BC, during the Lamian War) he was sent with a military expedition to Megara, from where he traveled to the Platonic Academy in Athens and resolved to devote himself to philosophy. At Megara he formed a lifelong friendship with Asclepiades of Phlius, with whom he toiled in the night that he might study philosophy by day. Later, Asclepiades and Menedemus went to Elis and became students of the philosophical descendants of Phaedo of Elis, namely Anchipylus and Moschus. He was subsequently a pupil first of Stilpo and then of, whose school he transferred to Eretria, by which name it was afterward known. Around 310 BC, Asclepiades and Menedemus visited Salamis in Cyprus, where they stayed at the court of King Nikocreon.

In addition to his philosophical work, he took a leading part in the political affairs of his city from the time of the Diadochi until his death. By about 300 BC, Menedemus began to assume a prominent position in the political life of his hometown on the island of Euboea. He is said to have campaigned for the independence of Eretria, which had lost much of its former importance at that time, and accompanied numerous embassies to other Greek cities. During this time, Menedemus grew close to Antigonus II Gonatas, the king of Macedonia who dominated Euboea. His friendship with Antigonus II Gonatas seems to have roused suspicion as to his loyalty, and he sought safety first in the temple of Amphiaraus at Oropus, and later with Antigonus, at whose court he is said to have died of grief. Other accounts say that he starved himself to death on failing to induce Antigonus to free his native city.

== Relationships ==
According to Diogenes Laertius, Menedemus married the mother of his older friend Asclepiades's wife. When Asclepiades's wife died, he is said to have left his wife to him and married someone richer with whom he had three daughters. His first wife continued to run the household. Menedemus was friends with the poets Aratos of Soloi, Lycophron of Chalcis, and Antagoras of Rhodes. Diogenes Laertius names Dionysius of Heraclea and Antigonus II Gonatas as possible students of Menedemus.

== Philosophy ==
His philosophical views are known only in part. Athenaeus quotes Epicrates as stating that he was a Platonist, but other accounts credit him with having preferred Stilpo to Plato. Diogenes Laërtius says that he declined to identify the Good with the Useful and that he denied the value of the negative proposition on the ground that affirmation alone can express truth. In ethics we learn from Plutarch and from Cicero that he regarded Virtue as one, by whatever name it be called, and maintained that it is intellectual. Cicero's evidence is less valuable because he always assumed that Menedemus was a follower of the Megarian school. Diogenes says that he left no writings, and the Eretrian school disappeared after a short and unobtrusive existence.
