= Eretrian school =

Hellenistic Greek philosophical school

The Eretrian school of philosophy was originally the School of Elis, where it had been founded by Phaedo of Elis; it was later transferred to Eretria by his pupil Menedemus. It can be referred to as the Elian-Eretrian School, on the assumption that the views of the two schools were similar. It died out after the time of Menedemus (3rd century BC), and, consequently, very little is known about its tenets. Phaedo had been a pupil of Socrates, and Plato named a dialogue, Phaedo, in his honor, but it is not possible to infer his doctrines from the dialogue. Menedemus was a pupil of Stilpo at Megara before becoming a pupil of Phaedo; in later times, the views of his school were often linked with those of the Megarian school. Menedemus' friend and colleague in the Eretrian school was Asclepiades of Phlius.

Like the Megarians they seem to have believed in the individuality of "the Good," the denial of the plurality of virtue, and of any real difference existing between the Good and the True. Cicero tells us that they placed all good in the mind, and in that acuteness of mind by which the truth is discerned. They denied that truth could be inferred by negative categorical propositions, and would only allow positive ones, and of these only simple ones.
