= 156 Xanthippe =

Main-belt asteroid

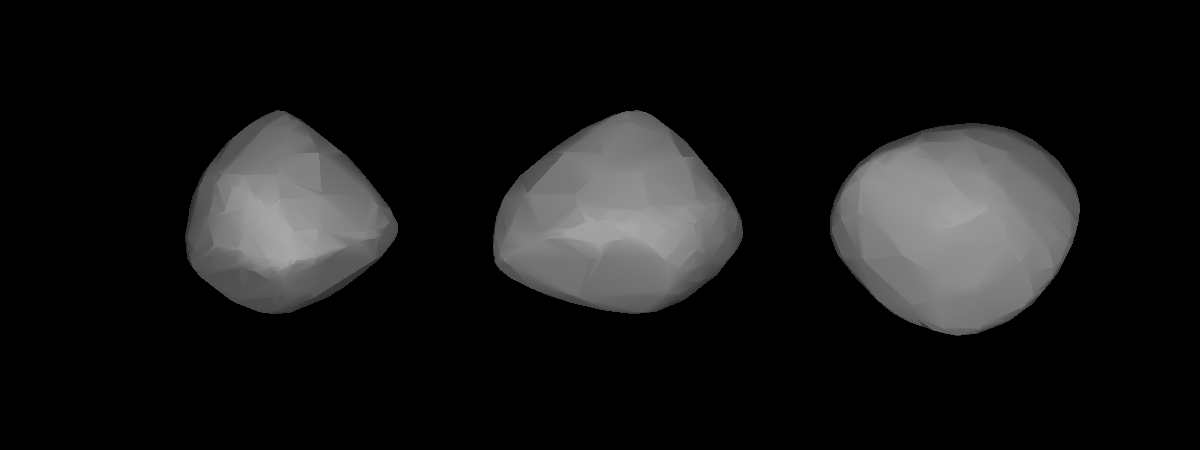
- Lightcurve-based 3D model of 156 Xanthippe

Discovery
- Discovered by: J. Palisa
- Discovery site: Austrian Naval Obs.
- Discovery date: 22 November 1875

Designations
- Pronunciation: /zænˈθɪpiː/
- Named after: Xanthippe (wife of Socrates)
- Alternative designations: A875 WA; 1901 SA; 1902 VA; 1936 FG_{1}; 1942 RP; 1949 BN
- Minor planet category: main-belt · (middle) background

Orbital characteristics
- Epoch 23 March 2018 (JD 2458200.5)
- Uncertainty parameter 0
- Observation arc: 116.46 yr (42,537 d)
- Aphelion: 3.3475 AU
- Perihelion: 2.1069 AU
- Semi-major axis: 2.7272 AU
- Eccentricity: 0.2274
- Orbital period (sidereal): 4.50 yr (1,645 d)
- Mean anomaly: 34.237°
- Mean motion: 0° 13^{m} 7.68^{s} / day
- Inclination: 9.7818°
- Longitude of ascending node: 241.83°
- Argument of perihelion: 338.29°

Physical characteristics
- Mean diameter: 115.93±4.26 km (composite estimate) Individual estimates: 110.409 km; 110.718±2.187 km; 115.49±1.74 km; 120.99±2.5 km; 121.68±41.10 km; 122.02±31.66 km; 143.346±0.903 km; 143.35±0.90 km
- Mass: (7.8±2.5)×10^{17} kg (Note: Calculated from its standard gravitational parameter GM = 0.052±0.017 km^{3}/s^{2}.)
- Mean density: 0.51 g/cm^{3} (Note: Assuming a diameter of 143 km.)
- Synodic rotation period: 22 h 22.104±0.006 h 22.37±0.01 h 22.5 h
- Geometric albedo: 0.030±0.004; 0.03±0.03; 0.04±0.03; 0.0422±0.002; 0.047±0.002; 0.0504±0.0120; 0.0687
- Spectral type: Tholen = C SMASS = Ch; B–V = 0.713; U–B = 0.315
- Absolute magnitude (H): 8.31; 8.31±0.09; 8.64; 8.65; 8.83±0.30

156 Xanthippe is a dark background asteroid from the central regions of the asteroid belt, approximately 120 kilometers (75 miles) in diameter. It was discovered on 22 November 1875, by Austrian astronomer Johann Palisa at the Austrian Naval Observatory, in what is now Croatia. It is named after Xanthippe, the wife of the Greek philosopher Socrates.

== Orbit and classification ==
Xanthippe is a non-family asteroid from the main belt's background population. It orbits the Sun in the central main-belt at a distance of 2.1–3.3 AU once every 4 years and 6 months (1,645 days; semi-major axis of 2.73 AU). Its orbit has an eccentricity of 0.23 and an inclination of 10° with respect to the ecliptic.

== Physical characteristics ==
Photometric observations of this asteroid at the European Southern Observatory in La Silla, Chile during 1981 gave a light curve with a period of 22.5 hours. Based upon its spectrum this is classified as a hydrated C-type asteroid (Ch-subtype) in the SMASS classification, indicating that it likely has a carbonaceous composition.

=== Diameter and albedo ===
According to the surveys carried out by the Infrared Astronomical Satellite IRAS, the Japanese Akari satellite and the NEOWISE mission of NASA's Wide-field Infrared Survey Explorer, Xanthippe measures between 110.409 and 143.35 kilometers in diameter and its surface has an albedo between 0.030 and 0.0687.

== Naming ==
This minor planet was named for Xanthippe, the wife of the Greek philosopher Socrates (c. 470–399 BC), after whom asteroid 5450 Sokrates was named. The official naming citation was mentioned in The Names of the Minor Planets by Paul Herget in 1955 (H 20).
