= Atticus (philosopher) =

2nd-century Greek philosopher

Atticus (fl. c. 175 AD) was an Ancient Greek Platonist philosopher who lived in the second century, under the emperor Marcus Aurelius. His lifetime fell into the epoch of Middle Platonism, of which he was one of the most notable representatives.

Atticus was vehemently anti-Peripatetic. From the writings of Atticus, which have only been handed down in fragmentary form, it can be seen that he was conservative and wanted to purge what he saw as the original teachings of Plato from the intrusion of elements of Aristotelianism. As an interpreter of Plato, Atticus thought philologically and advocated a literal, not metaphorical, interpretation of Plato's doctrine of creation. Atticus' position represents a version of Platonism according to which deviation from the literal word of the master means irredeemable heretical opposition. His work was a polemic, possibly originating from his position as the first holder of the Platonic philosophy chair at Athens under Marcus Aurelius. Atticus insisted that Aristotle was an atheist, that he denied the existence of the soul, and that he rejected divine providence. This led him to believe that the world had a beginning in time.

With this rejection of the eternity of the world and also with his understanding of the Demiurge and the theory of forms, as well as his anti-Aristotelian attitude, Atticus represented a decidedly opposed position to views that later became part of the core of the ideas of Neoplatonism in Late Antiquity. He exerted a large degree of influence on later Neoplatonists, most of whom disputed his philosophical ideas, as well as influencing many Christian philosophers, who often saw his ideas as more compatible with theirs.

== Life ==
Very little is known about the life of Atticus. In the Chronicle of Eusebius of Caesarea, Atticus' philosophical activity is mentioned in a brief entry from the year 176. Since 176 was the year in which Emperor Marcus Aurelius established four philosophical chairs in Athens, the date may indicate a connection with this edict; Atticus may have been the first to hold the chair of Platonic philosophy. Among his students was Harpocration of Argos.

== Works ==
Much that is known of him comes from the fragments of his book preserved in Eusebius' Preparatio Evangelica. However, some of them are extensive and give a detailed impression of his positions. Most of the fragments come from Atticus' commentary on Plato's dialogue Timaeus; the longest, which take up by far the most space in the critical edition, are taken from his treatise Against Those Who Want to Explain Plato's Teachings by Aristotle's. He also wrote a commentary on Plato's dialogue Phaedrus. Whether he also wrote a treatise on the soul (or on the world soul) is uncertain. According to George Karamanolis, the hypothesis that he also commented on Aristotle's categories that has been put forth by some scholars is unlikely. As a commentator, Atticus was primarily a conscientious philologist; he stuck strictly to the wording of the commented text, instead of starting from his own philosophical speculations.

== Philosophy ==
=== Critique of Aristotelianism ===
A primary concern of Atticus is a clear demarcation between Platonic and Aristotelian philosophy. He emphatically opposes attempts to construct a harmony between Plato and Aristotle and to interpret Plato's works with the help of Aristotelian teachings. He considered Aristotle's approaches to be wrong, and believed that Aristotle systematically created his philosophy as a counter-concept to Platonism.

One accusation he directed against Aristotle is that he violated the rules of nature observation, because he disregarded the principle that the observer of nature does not have to establish laws, but should investigate the laws given by nature. The Aristotelian theory of the celestial bodies contradicts the observable phenomena and thus does not fulfill the task of explaining the phenomena.

=== Ontology and theology ===
Atticus regards the Demiurge, the creator of the world in Plato's Timaeus, as the supreme god. Ontologically, he sees the Demiurge as the supreme first principle; he identifies the Demiurge with the Platonic Form of the Good, the good in itself, which appears as the supreme deity in Plato's Republic. In doing so, he follows the conservative direction in Middle Platonism, which is also represented by Albinus, and contradicts the view of the prominent Middle Platonist and Neopythagorean Numenius. Numenius, like the later Neoplatonists Plotinus and Proclus, had understood the Demiurge as a separate entity, one subordinate to "The Good". According to the common view of the Middle Platonists, the Demiurge creates the world by looking at the archetypes (ideas) of things. Atticus shares this view but, unlike most Middle Platonists, does not assume that the world of ideas resides in the intellect (nous) of the Demiurge. Rather, he assigns it a separate existence outside of the nous, on the level of the soul.

A feature of Atticus' theology is that it does not share the otherwise dominant belief among ancient Platonists that the supreme deity, because of its perfection, necessarily knows no change over time. The god of Atticus considers, plans, waits, decides and takes personal care of the things he has created. This idea of God is therefore closer to that of popular religion (and Christianity) than the conventional theology of the Platonists. It is a counter-model to the teachings of Aristotle and Epicurus, which Atticus fought against, which postulate no divine providence dealing with individual destinies, rather, Providence is one of the doctrines that Atticus most emphatically defends.

=== Creation of the world ===
In the highly debated question of whether or not the account of the creation of the world in Plato's Timaeus is to be understood in the sense of a temporal beginning of the world, Atticus advocates a temporal beginning. In accordance with his general philological way of thinking, he prefers a literal understanding of the text. With this interpretation he turns against the position of numerous Platonists, according to whom the cosmos must be eternal for philosophical reasons and therefore Plato's statements about creation are to be understood metaphorically. According to the metaphorical interpretation, Plato does not mean an act of creation at a specific point in time, but only wants to express a timeless dependency of the eternally existing world on the equally eternal deity. Atticus, on the other hand, believes that, according to Plato's teaching, there was a time before the Demiurge created the world. In this he sees no contradiction to his conviction that being a Demiurge consists of creation. He thinks that the demiurge, before he created the world as an image, had already created and preserved its archetype. As the everlasting cause of the archetypal world of ideas, the demiurge was never idle, which would be incompatible with his nature. Atticus ascribes no agency to the archetype itself as a force involved in the creation of the world; for him it has the function of a demiurge's plan for the world, and does not belong to the realm of the eternal and ungenerated. Despite this relatively low classification of the world of forms for a Platonist, Atticus sees in it more than just the means to the end of creating the cosmos; it has its own intrinsic value.

According to the wording of Plato's Timaeus, to which Atticus adheres, when the Creator created the world, he found matter already there, which was in disordered motion (chaos). So matter was not part of creation. Therefore, Atticus, assuming a one-time act of creation of the cosmos, assumes uncreated matter (hyle) independent of the Demiurge. In doing so, he is committed to a dualistic model: God and matter exist independently of one another and originally have nothing to do with one another.

Since in this model the primordial matter was already in motion before the creation of the world, the question arises as to the cause of this movement. Atticus, who traces every movement back to a soul as its originator, assigns matter its own soul. He thus regards matter as animated (hylozoism). Since the movement of pre-cosmic matter was chaotic according to the Timaeus, no naturally perfect soul can be considered as the cause of this movement for Atticus, for a perfect or good soul could only produce order. From this Atticus concludes that the soul of the primordial matter must itself be disordered and therefore "bad" (kakḗ). For him, together with the matter it enlivens, the soul is the cause of badness in the world. Atticus uses the technical term "malicious soul" (kakergétis psychḗ) for this, which is characteristic of his teaching. Only through the demiurge's act of creation did the bad soul of matter receive a divine addition. In this way it received a share in both the world of ideas and in the nous, and accepted reason. Since then, the material world has been making orderly movements. So the originally evil soul of matter became the good (although not entirely perfect) world soul. However, the "malicious soul" was not completely transformed, but continued to exist as a bad part of the soul in the cosmos and continued to develop its effects to a limited extent. The natural badness of matter is not remedied by the change of its soul, but is limited; it only affects the area between the Moon and the Earth (imagined as the center of the world). This area is the only part of the cosmos in which, according to Plato's teaching, evil occurs.

Atticus shares the idea with other Platonists in principle that the world soul owes its reason and goodness to the creative deity. However, since he understands creation in terms of time, in contrast to those who interpret it metaphorically, he assumes a real time period in the past in which there was no good world soul, but only the bad soul of matter. Thus, for him, the world soul belongs to the created things, it does not exist independent of time.

In contrast to the thinkers who consider the cosmos to be eternal, and Plato's account of creation to be metaphorical, Atticus feels compelled to grapple with the paradox of a temporal emergence of time. According to the Timaeus, time arose together with the cosmos. Atticus solves this problem by assuming two kinds of time: a pre-cosmic disordered time and the familiar, ordered time that has only existed since the act of creation. He believes that the timing of the act of creation was not chosen arbitrarily, but that the Creator observed the changes in chaos until it reached a state suitable for the creation of the world.

With his doctrine of creation, Atticus also combats the Aristotelian view that everything that has come into being must inevitably perish. He assumes a beginning of the world, but not an end of the world. As something created and changeable, the world is inherently transitory, but the Demiurge's will prevents its dissolution. The creator must have the ability to save his creation from destruction. Otherwise the divine will would be weak and defective and thus ungodly. It would be subordinate to the law of nature, which determines the transience of what has become, and inferior to it as a cause. That would contradict the hierarchical character of the world order.

=== Doctrine on the soul ===
Atticus emphatically defended the Platonic doctrine of the immortality of the soul against Aristotle. He accuses Aristotle of advocating a view of the soul which amounts to denying not only the activities of the soul but also its substance and character, arguing that by separating it from the intellect (nous); Aristotle makes the soul superfluous. For Atticus, the world soul organizes and permeates everything, because only if a single ensouled force connects and holds everything together, can the universe be managed sensibly and beautifully.

Atticus teaches that the human immortal rational soul (logikḗ psychḗ) is to be understood as the union of a divine and a non-rational soul. He regards the irrational soul as the substratum, the divine as the ordering principle and as the bearer of the nous. In addition, he also accepts an unreasoning, ephemeral life principle (álogos zōḗ). He identifies this principle with the mortal aspects of the soul in the Timaeus, which are the source of passionate desire. From his point of view, this irrational, unreasoning part is not a real part of the soul, but only a temporary addition that the soul receives for the duration of its stay in the body, which comes from the "malicious" soul of matter and returns to it at man's death. In the embryo, Atticus apparently assumes animation and formation solely through the irrational life-principle; the embryo is not yet a human being for him, but only becomes such later, when the rational soul comes in from the outside.

=== Ethics ===
In Ethics, Atticus's rejection of Aristotelianism is particularly acute. He defends the Platonic doctrine that virtue alone is sufficient to attain eudaimonia, against the view of the Aristotelians. The Aristotelian doctrine states that physical and external goods are also required for eudaimonia. Thus it is necessary that the virtuous man who strives for eudaimonia be additionally favored by favorable external circumstances, otherwise eudaimonia is beyond his reach. Atticus polemicizes against the thesis that human happiness also depends on noble origins, physical beauty and prosperity, which he sees as low and misguided thinking.

== Legacy ==
=== In Classical antiquity ===
The impact of Atticus' philosophy was considerable and lasting. His teachings on cosmology and the soul influenced the physician Galen, who, however, rejected his view of the formation of the embryo. The prominent Peripatetic Alexander of Aphrodisias dealt with Atticus' criticism of Aristotle. In the 3rd century the Platonist Longinus was influenced by the metaphysics of Atticus.

In the Neoplatonic school which Plotinus founded in Rome in the 3rd century, Atticus's comments on Plato were part of the curriculum. Plotinus' pupil Porphyry and his pupil and adversary Iamblichus made extensive use of the Timaeus commentary. Also, other Neoplatonists like Proclus, Syrianus, Damascius and Simplicius commented - often critically - on the teachings of Atticus. However, they did not rely on his original writings, at least in part, but on the works of Porphyry and Iamblichus. Proclus dealt intensively with the views of Middle Platonism. He emphasized - probably ironically - Atticus' extraordinary diligence. Hierocles seems to have had Atticus in particular in mind when he attacked philosophers who portrayed Plato and Aristotle as representing opposing positions. Polemics against Aristotle were displeasing in Neoplatonic circles; already Plotinus teacher Ammonius Saccas had tried in the 3rd century to show a harmony between Plato and Aristotle. Atticus' opinion that the ideas were outside of the nous and his idea of the demiurge were also wrong from the Neoplatonic point of view. His doctrine of the chronological origin of the world and of a time before the beginning of the world seemed to them absurd.

Atticus also received a great deal of attention from Christians, since his conception of God is relatively compatible with the Christian one and his interpretation of Plato's account of creation meets the Christian doctrine of creation. Christian authors who mention or quote him include Eusebius of Caesarea, Theodoret, John Philoponus, and Aeneas of Gaza. The late antique theologian Arius, after whom Arianism is named, also shows parallels in his theological thinking to the ideas of Atticus, but there is no concrete evidence of a direct influence.

=== Modern reception ===
In modern research, it is often noted by scholars that Atticus' confrontation with Aristotelianism was characterized by his polemical intention, and that he often painted a superficial and distorted picture of Aristotelian philosophy. Critics also observe that Atticus did not do justice to his own concern to present the authentic philosophy of Plato, because he was guilty of an "improper simplification" of the Platonic ontology. On the other hand, it is also acknowledged that he succeeded in designing a system that could measure up to the alternative models that were common at the time in terms of its coherence, and that that also deserves attention from today's perspective on Platonism.
