= Harpocration of Argos =

Harpocration of Argos (Ancient Greek: Ἁρποκρατίων ὁ ̓Αργει̂ος) was an Ancient Greek Middle Platonist philosopher who lived in the second half of the 2nd century CE.

== Life ==
All that is known about Harpocration's early life is that he came from Argos. He was a student of the Middle Platonist Atticus. According to the Suda, he was a confidant (symbiōtḗs) of an emperor; presumably not Marcus Aurelius, who would have mentioned him otherwise in the Meditations.

Harpocration had previously been identified with a grammarian of the same name who was the teacher of the emperor Lucius Verus, however this identification has been rejected by more recent research because it is not chronologically consistent for a student of Atticus (fl. c. 175) to have been a teacher to an emperor born in 130.

== Works ==
Only a few fragments of Harpocration's works have survived. In the Suda two works are attributed to him: a commentary on the works of Plato in 24 books and a Platonic lexicon in two books. The extent fragments come from the Plato commentary. The dialogues expounded in this work included Alcibiades I, Phaedo, Phaedrus, Republic and Timaeus.

== Doctrines ==
Although Harpocration was a student of Atticus, his philosophical views show some similarity to those of the Pythagoreanizing Platonist Numenius of Apamea. Like Numenius, he assumes three gods or three aspects of divinity, namely one aspect for the supreme, inactive god and two aspects for the creator god (Demiurge), whom he considers to be double or divided into two aspects. On the other hand, in the controversial question of the Eternity of the world, like Atticus, Harpocration represents the opinion rejected by Numenius that the creation of the world described in the Timaeus is to be understood as a real process in time, and therefore not purely metaphorical. Like Atticus, he considers the world as something created to be potentially transitory, but imperishable by the will of the Demiurge. Like Numenius, he also regards every incarnation of the soul as an evil, because he sees the body as the source of evil in the soul. He attributes immortality not only to human souls, but also to those of animals.

== Legacy ==
The late antique Neoplatonist Proclus mentions Harpocration in a list of important Platonists and criticizes his theology. Other late antique Neoplatonists (Iamblichus, Hermias, Damascius, and Olympiodorus the Younger) as well as the Christian philosopher Aeneas of Gaza also mention him.
