= Asclepiades of Phlius =

Ancient Greek philosopher

Asclepiades of Phlius (Greek: Ἀσκληπιάδης ὁ Φλιάσιος; c. 350 – c. 270 BC) was a Greek philosopher in the Eretrian school of philosophy. He was the friend of Menedemus of Eretria, and they both went to live in Megara and studied under Stilpo, before sailing to Elis to join Phaedo's school. His friendship with Menedemus was said to have been hardly inferior to the friendship of Pylades and Orestes. As impoverished young men living in Athens, they were one day summoned before the Areopagus, to explain how they could spend all day with the philosophers if they had no visible means of support. They summoned a miller to the court to explain that they threshed grain at night for 2 drachmas, whereupon the Areopagites were so astonished that they awarded the two men 200 drachmas as a reward.

They eventually settled in Eretria, having transferred Phaedo's school there. It was said that they were both married and that Asclepiades was married to the mother, and Menedemus to the daughter. And when Asclepiades's wife died, he took the wife of Menedemus, and Menedemus went on to marry a rich woman. They all lived in one house, and Menedemus entrusted the whole management of it to his former wife. Asclepiades died before Menedemus, at Eretria, at a great age.
