= Thomas Kjeller Johansen =

Danish-Norwegian philosopher

- Born: 1965 (age 60–61)
- Awards: Norwegian Academy of the Sciences (elected member)

Education
- Education: University of Cambridge (PhD), Trinity College, Cambridge (BA)
- Thesis: The Material Basis of Perception in Aristotle (1994)
- Doctoral advisor: M. F. Burnyeat

Philosophical work
- Era: 21st-century philosophy
- Region: Western philosophy
- Institutions: University of Oslo (2016–), University of Oxford (2006–2016), University of Edinburgh (2003–2006), University of Bristol (1996–2002)
- Main interests: ancient Greek philosophy

Thomas Kjeller Johansen (born 1965) is a Danish-Norwegian philosopher and Professor of Philosophy at the University of Oslo. He is known for his works on ancient philosophy and serves as the co-editor of Phronesis.

== Career ==
Johansen studied philosophy at the University of Copenhagen from 1984 to 1986, before enrolling for a BA in classics and philosophy at Trinity College, Cambridge, which he graduated in 1989. He was awarded a PhD from Cambridge in 1994 under M.F. Burnyeat with a thesis titled The Material Basis of Perception in Aristotle.

His first academic appointment was as a teaching fellow in Greek philosophy and language at the University of Bristol (1993-1995), before becoming a lecturer in philosophy at Aberdeen (1995-1996). He then returned to Bristol as a lecturer in classics and ancient philosophy, before going on to lecture in philosophy at Edinburgh (2003-2006) and Oxford (2006-2016), where he became Professor of Ancient Philosophy in 2014. He was also Tutural Fellow of Brasenose College. In 2016 he became Professor of Philosophy at the University of Oslo, a role he still holds as of 2026.

== Recognition ==
In 2025 he was awarded an ERC Advanced Grant for a project on the Mathematization of Nature in Plato and early Pythagoreanism.

== Books ==
- The Powers of Aristotle's Soul, Oxford University Press, 2012
- Plato's Natural Philosophy: A Study of the Timaeus-Critias, Cambridge University Press, 2004
- Aristotle on the Sense-Organs, Cambridge University Press, 1997
- Aristotle: Metaphysics Alpha and alpha, Clarendon Aristotle Series, Oxford University Press 2025
