= Euthydemus of Chios =

Greek sophist born in Chios

Euthydemus of Chios (Latin: Euthydemus, Greek: Εὐθύδημος) also Euthydemos was a Greek sophist born in Chios, who emigrated with his brother Dionysodorus to Thurii in Italy. When exiled from this city, he went to Athens where he lived for many years. Euthydemus was an older contemporary of Socrates. Plato depicts him and his brother in the Euthydemus dialogue, and he is further referenced by Aristotle.

== See also ==
- List of speakers in Plato's dialogues
