= Alopece =

Ancient Athenian deme

Coordinates: 37°57′00″N 23°45′00″E

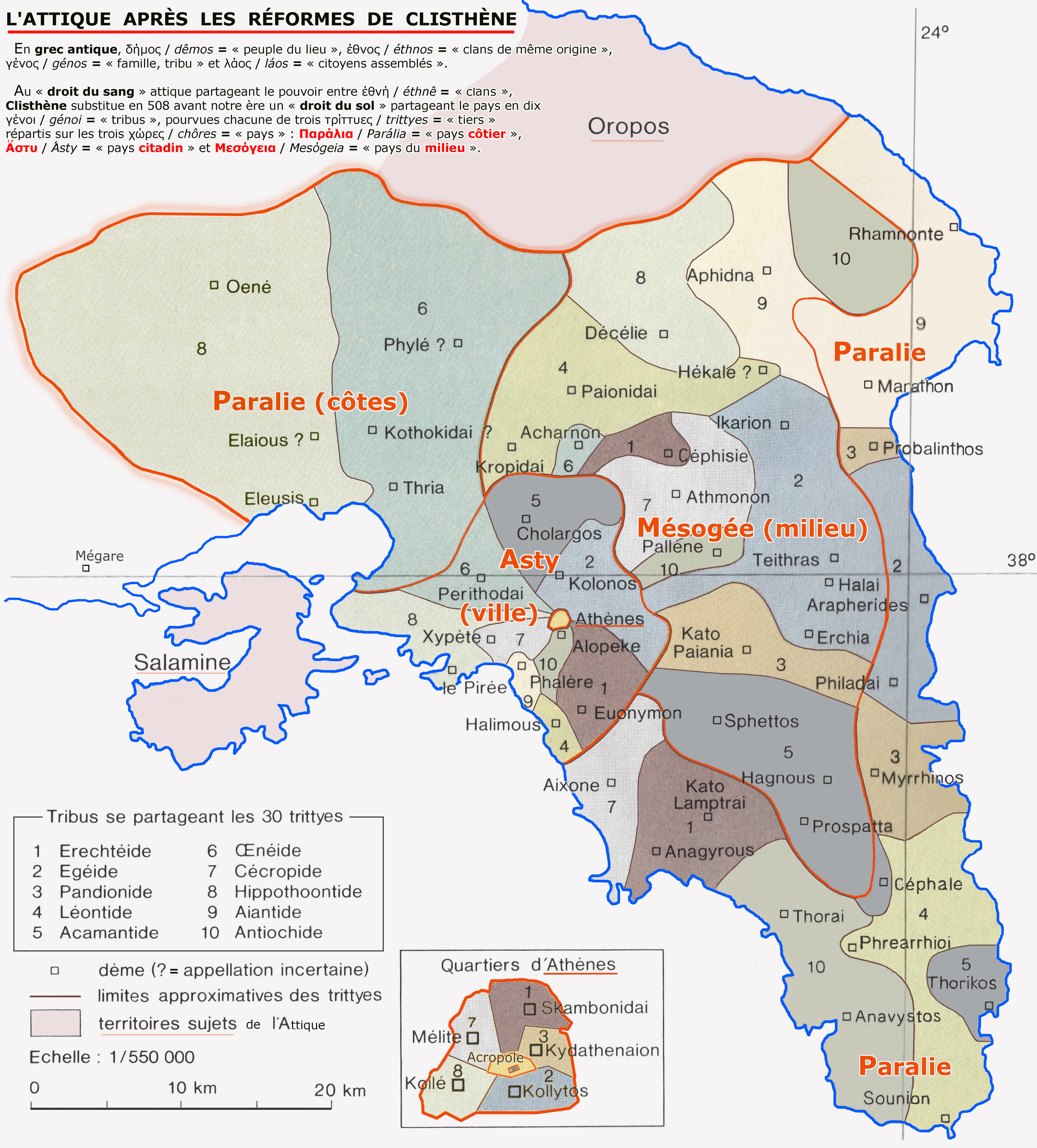
Map of classical Attica showing the location of Alopece in Athens.

Alopece (Ancient Greek: Ἀλωπεκή, romanized: Alopeke), also spelt as Alopecae, was an asty deme of the city of Athens, but located exterior to the city wall of Athens. Alopece belonged to the tribal group (phyle) of Antiochis. It was situated only eleven or twelve stadia from the city, and not far from Cynosarges. It possessed a temple of Aphrodite, and also apparently one of Hermaphroditus.

== Burial site ==
The tomb of Anchimolus is near the temple of Hercules at Cynosarges, within Alopece.

== Natives ==
Lysimachus II – son of Aristides I, Aristides II – son of Lysimachus II, Thucydides II – son of Melesias II, Melesias II – son of Thucydides I, Socrates, son of Sophroniscus (of the tribe of Alopece).

Critobolus (c.5/4th century BC) son of Crito (also of the deme), both followers of Socrates.

Hermogenes (c.445 to after 392 BC), was credited by Xenophon as being the source of much information about the latter part Socrates' life. In addition he is a participant in Cratylus, and is mentioned in Phaedo.

Megacles son of Hippocrates, Cleisthenes' nephew and leader of the Alcmaeonids. Also Callias, son of Cratias.

Megacles V, son of Megacles IV. Melesius, a famous wrestler, father of Thucydides I.

Satyrus, brother of Lacadaemonius, was arbitrator at a trial involving a dispute on the release of an enslaved woman, who had stolen from her owner prior to her release.

== Property ==
Timarchus had a farm there (97), eleven or twelve stades from the city wall (99).

Records dating from the years 367 to 366, show a person from Lakiadai had acquired property in this deme, which was previously owned by a person affiliated with Xypetē.

== See also ==
- Megacles
