= Lamprocles =

Son of Socrates

Lamprocles (Greek: Λαμπροκλῆς) was Socrates' and Xanthippe's eldest son. His two brothers were Menexenus and Sophroniscus. Lamprocles was a youth (μειράκιον meirakion) at the time of Socrates' trial and death. According to Aristotle, Socrates' descendants as a whole turned out to be unremarkable "fools and dullards".
