= Menexenus =

Son of Socrates and Xanthippe

Menexenus (/məˈnɛksənəs/; Greek: Μενέξενος) was one of the three sons of Socrates and Xanthippe. His two brothers were Lamprocles and Sophroniscus. Menexenus is not to be confused with the character of the same name who appears in Plato's dialogues Menexenus and Lysis. Socrates' sons Menexenus and Sophroniscus were still children at the time of their father's trial and death, one of them small enough to be held in his mother's arms. According to Aristotle, Socrates' descendants all turned out to be unremarkable "fools and dullards".
