= Euthydemus (dialogue) =

Platonic dialogue

Euthydemus (Greek: Εὐθύδημος, Euthydemos), written c. 384 BC, is a dialogue by Plato which satirizes what Plato presents as the logical fallacies of the Sophists. In it, Socrates describes to his friend Crito a visit he and various youths paid to two brothers, Euthydemus and Dionysodorus, both of whom were prominent Sophists and pankrationists from Chios and Thurii.

The Euthydemus contrasts Socratic argumentation and education with the methods of Sophism, to the detriment of the latter. Throughout the dialogue, Euthydemus and Dionysodorus continually attempt to ensnare Socrates with what are presented as deceptive and meaningless arguments, primarily to demonstrate their professed philosophical superiority.

As in many of the Socratic dialogues, the two Sophists against whom Socrates argues were indeed real people. Euthydemus was somewhat famous at the time the dialogue was written, and is mentioned several times by both Plato and Aristotle. Likewise, Dionysodorus is mentioned by Xenophon.

== Eristic argument ==
Plato defines Euthydemus' and Dionysodorus' argumentation as 'eristic'. This literally means "designed for wrangling" (ἐρίς, eris, meaning 'strife' in Greek). No matter how one attempts to refute eristic arguments, the argument is designed so that any means of refutation will fail. For example, at one point, Euthydemus attempts to prove the impossibility of falsehood:

"Non-facts do not exist do they?"
"No, they don't."
"And things which do not exist do not exist anywhere, do they?"
"No."
"Now, is it possible for things which do not exist to be the object of any action, in the sense that things which do not exist anywhere can have anything done to them?
"I don't think so."
"Well then, when politicians speak in the Assembly, isn't that an activity?"
"Yes, it is."
"And if it's an activity, they are doing something?"
"Yes."
"Then speech is activity, and doing something?"
He agreed.

"So no one speaks non-existent things: I mean, he would already, in speaking, be doing something, and you have agreed that it is impossible for non-existent things to have anything done to them by anybody. So you have committed to the view that lies never happen: if Dionysodorus speaks, he speaks facts–that is, truth."

== Characters ==
- Socrates
- Crito
- Clinias
- Euthydemus
- Dionysodorus
- Ctesippus

== Translations ==
- Thomas Taylor, 1804
- Benjamin Jowett, 1892, Euthydemus
- Edwin Gifford, 1905 *
- Walter Rangeley Maitland Lamb, 1924 *
- Robin Waterfield, 1987
- Rosamond Kent Sprague, 1993, Euthydemus
- Gregory A. McBrayer and Mary P. Nichols, 2011, Euthydemus
- Gwenda-lin Grewal, 2022, Thinking of Death in Plato's Euthydemus: A Close Reading and New Translation
