= Rachana Kamtekar =

American philosopher (born 1965)

- Born: 2 April 1965 (age 61)

Education
- Education: University of Chicago (PhD), Stanford University (BA)

Philosophical work
- Era: 21st-century philosophy
- Region: Western philosophy
- Institutions: Cornell University
- Main interests: ancient philosophy, moral psychology

Rachana Kamtekar (born 2 April 1965) is an American philosopher and Professor of Philosophy at Cornell University. She is known for her works on ancient philosophy. She is the current editor of the Journal Oxford Studies in Ancient Philosophy.

== Books ==
- Plato's Moral Psychology: Intellectualism, the Divided Soul, and Desire for Good, Oxford University Press 2017
- Virtue and Happiness: Essays in Honour of Julia Annas (ed.), Oxford University Press 2012
- A Companion to Socrates, co-editor with Sara Ahbel-Rappe, Blackwell 2006
- Critical Essays on Plato’s Euthyphro, Crito, and Apology (ed.), Rowman and Littlefield 2004
