= Dionysodorus (sophist) =

5th-century BC Greek sophist philosopher

Dionysodorus (Greek: Διονυσόδωρος, Dionysódōros; c. 430 – late 5th century or early 4th century BCE) was an ancient Greek sophistic philosopher and teacher of martial arts, generalship, and oration. Closely associated with his brother and fellow sophist Euthydemus, he is depicted in the writing of Plato and Xenophon.

== Life ==
Plato's Euthydemus features Dionysodorus and Euthydemus as prominent interlocutors. According to the dialogue, the brothers were born on the Aegean island of Chios before relocating as colonists to Thurii in Magna Graecia of modern-day Italy. After being exiled from Thurii, perhaps in 413, they came to Athens. According to Socrates in the Euthydemus, the two taught fighting in armor and legal oration before developing an interest in sophistry. Xenophon in the Memorabilia further attributes the teaching of generalship to Dionysodorus specifically.

Additionally, an individual named Dionysodorus appears in Lysias' Against Agoratus speech, who potentially matches the sophist on several biographical details. This Dionysodorus was a general and taxiarch who supported the democracy; if the general and sophist are one and the same, Dionysodorus may have become a naturalized Athenian citizen along with many other foreign residents before the Battle of Arginusae.

== Philosophy ==
Throughout the Euthydemus, Plato depicts Dionysodorus and his brother employing a string of logical fallacies against Socrates and his student Clinias (III), son of Axiochus. Scholars have suggested that Plato here chose the brothers as token sophists worthy of ridicule. Aristotle preserves, and refutes, a specific argument of Euthydemus, which implied that "a man knows that there is a trireme in the Piraeus because he knows each of the two things ['a trireme' and 'in the Piraeus'] separately."

In Xenophon's Memorabilia, Socrates examines a student of Dionysodorus who appears not to have learned basic elements of generalship. The implication seems to be either that Dionysodorus has shamelessly taken the student's payments without giving him his money's worth, or that Dionysodorus himself is ignorant of the very art of generalship he claims to teach. This is apparently in keeping with Plato's critique of Dionysodorus, although the biographical details are in conflict.

== See also ==
- List of speakers in Plato's dialogues
