= Phronesis (journal) =

- Discipline: Ancient philosophy
- Language: English
- Edited by: Thomas Kjeller Johansen, Alex Long

Publication details
- History: 1955–present
- Publisher: Brill Publishers
- Frequency: Quarterly

Standard abbreviations
- ISO 4: Phronesis

Indexing
- ISSN: 0031-8868 (print); 1568-5284 (web)
- LCCN: 59035648
- OCLC no.: 4359643

Links
- Journal homepage

Phronesis is a peer-reviewed academic journal covering the study of ancient philosophy. It is indexed by PhilPapers and the Philosopher's Index. The journal was established in 1955 by Donald James Allan and Joseph Bright Skemp, who wrote in the first issue that the goal of the journal was to bring together philosophers and classicists from across national borders so as to improve the specialty of ancient philosophy, but also to include insights for those in medieval studies. Phronesis has been described as "pioneering" and one of the major English-language journals for ancient philosophy. The journal is published by Brill Publishers and the editors-in-chief are Thomas Kjeller Johansen (University of Oslo) and Alex Long (University of St Andrews).
