= Debra Nails =

American philosophy professor (born 1950)

Debra Nails (born November 15, 1950) is an American philosophy professor who taught at Michigan State University. Nails earned her M.A. in philosophy and classical Greek from Louisiana State University before going on to earn a Ph.D. in philosophy at the University of the Witwatersrand, Johannesburg in 1993. Previously, she taught in the Department of Classics, Philosophy, and Religion at Mary Washington College. Nails taught courses on the history of philosophy, continental rationalism, metaphysics, and modern philosophy.

== Contributions to philosophy ==
Nails' work primarily focuses on ancient Greek philosophy, metaphysics, feminist philosophy, and early modern philosophy. She is the chair of the Committee for Professional Ethics of the American Association of University Professors and was previously on the Committee for the Defense of Professional Rights of Philosophers, and the Committee on Academic Career Opportunities and Placement of the American Philosophical Association.

== Awards and distinctions ==
In addition to being named chair of the Committee for Professional Ethics of the American Association of University Professors, Nails was also a Research Fellow at the Boston University Center for the Philosophy and History of Science and a University Postdoctoral Research Fellow at Witwatersrand University.

== Selected works ==
=== Books ===
- Nails, D. The People of Plato: A Prosopography of Plato and Other Socratics (Indianapolis and Cambridge: Hackett Publishing, 2002).

This is a biographical encyclopedia for Platonic and related ancient Greek scholarship. The Prosopography relates the lives of Plato and other Socratics through the biographical detail of persons mentioned in the Socratic literature. Plato introduces many contemporaries of Socrates as characters and as interlocutors in far-reaching philosophical explorations.

- Nails, D. Agora, Academy, and the Conduct of Philosophy. Philosophical Studies Series 63 (Dordrecht: Kluwer Academic Publishers, 1995).

=== Anthologies ===
- Second Sailing: Alternative Perspectives on Plato. Commentationes Humanarum Litterarum 132 (Scientiarum Fennica, 2015). Ed. D. Nails, H. Tarrant.
- The Bloomsbury Companion to Plato. Bloomsbury Companions Series (Bloomsbury, 2015). Ed. G. A. Press, D. Nails, F. Gonzales, H. Tarrant.
- Plato's Symposium: Issues in Interpretation and Reception. Hellenic Studies Series 22 (Harvard University Press, 2006). Ed. D. Nails, J. H. Lesher, and Frisbee C. C. Sheffield.
- Naturalistic Epistemology: A Symposium of Two Decades. Boston Studies in the Philosophy of Science Series 100 (Reidel, 1987). Ed. D. Nails, A. Shimony.
- Spinoza and the Sciences. Boston Studies in the Philosophy of Science Series 91 (Reidel, 1986). Ed. D. Nails and M. Grene.
- Women and Morality. Social Research 50:3 (1983). Ed. D. Nails, M. A. O'Loughlin and J. C. Walker.

=== Chapters in books ===
- Nails, D. "The Trial and Death of Socrates." In A Companion to Greek and Roman Political Thought, ed. Ryan Balot, pp. 323–38 (Oxford: Blackwell, 2009). [Reprinted from "A Companion to Socrates", ed. Sara Ahbel-Rappe and Rachana Kamtekar, pp. 5–20 (Oxford: Blackwell, 2006).]
- Nails, D. "Tragedy Off-Stage." In Plato's Symposium: Issues in Interpretation and Reception, ed. J. H. Lesher, D Nails, and Frisbee C. C. Sheffield, pp. 179–207. Hellenic Studies Series 22 (Cambridge: Harvard University Press, 2006).
- Nails, D. "The Life of Plato of Athens." In A Companion to Plato, ed. Hugh Benson, pp. 1–12 (Oxford: Blackwell, 2006).
- Nails, D. "Metaphysics at the Barricades: Spinoza and Race." In Race and Racism in Modern Philosophy, ed. Andrew Valls, pp. 57–72 (Ithaca: Cornell University Press, 2005).
- Nails, D. "Mouthpiece Schmouthpiece." In Who Speaks for Plato, ed. Gerald A. Press, pp. 15–26 (Lanham: Rowman and Littlefield, 1999).

=== Articles ===
- Nails, D. "Seduced by Prodicus," Southwest Philosophy Review 17:2 (2001), 129–39.
- Nails, D. "The Dramatic Date of Plato's Republic." The Classical Journal 93 (1998), 383–396.
- Nails, D. "Human Nature and the Founding of the Polis," Skepsis 8 (1997), 92–102.
- Nails, D. "Plato's 'Middle' Cluster," Phoenix 48:1 (1994), 62–67.
- Nails, D. "Problems with Vlastos's Platonic Developmentalism," Ancient Philosophy 13:2 (1993), 273–291.

== See also ==
- American Philosophy
- List of American philosophers
