= Hermogenes (philosopher) =

Athenian philosopher

Hermogenes (Ancient Greek: Ἑρμογένης; fl. 5th–4th century BC) was an ancient Athenian philosopher best remembered as a close friend of Socrates as depicted by Plato and Xenophon.

== Life ==
Hermogenes was the son of Hipponicus, brother of the wealthy Callias, and resident of the Alopece deme alongside Socrates. Although he belonged to the great family of Callias, he is mentioned by Xenophon as a man of very little property, suggesting that he may have been an illegitimate son of Hipponicus. Plato, on the other hand, suggests that he was unjustly deprived of his property by Callias, his brother.

He is an interlocutor in Plato's Cratylus dialogue, where he maintains that all the words of a language were formed by an agreement of people amongst themselves. Xenophon cites Hermogenes as his source on the trial of Socrates in his Apology, and Plato includes Hermogenes in the list of individuals present at Socrates' execution. Diogenes Laërtius states that he was one of the teachers of Plato, but this claim does not appear elsewhere in the surviving literature.

== See also ==
- List of speakers in Plato's dialogues
