= Alex Long =

British philosopher

- Born: 1979 (age 46–47)

Philosophical work
- Era: 21st-century philosophy
- Region: Western philosophy
- Institutions: University of St Andrews
- Main interests: Ancient Greek philosophy

Alex Long (born 1979) is a British philosopher and professor of philosophy at the University of St Andrews. He is known for his works on ancient Greek philosophy. Long is a co-editor of the journal Phronesis.

== Books ==
- Immortality in Ancient Philosophy (ed.), Cambridge University Press, 2021, ISBN 9781108832281.
- Death and Immortality in Ancient Philosophy, Cambridge University Press, 2019, ISBN 9781107086593.
- Plato and the Stoics, Long, A. G. (ed.), Cambridge University Press 2013
- Conversation and Self-Sufficiency in Plato, Oxford University Press, 2013, ISBN 9780199695355.
- Plato: Meno and Phaedo. Cambridge Texts in the History of Philosophy. By David Sedley (Editor) and Alex Long (Translator). Cambridge University Press, 2010. ISBN 978-0521676779
