= Cebes =

Early 4th-century BC Greek philosopher

Cebes of Thebes (Greek: Κέβης Θηβαῖος, gen.: Κέβητος; c. 430 – c. 350 BC) was an Ancient Greek philosopher from Thebes remembered as a disciple of Socrates.

== Life ==
Cebes was a disciple of Socrates and Philolaus, and a friend of Simmias of Thebes. He is one of the speakers in the Phaedo of Plato, in which he is represented as an earnest seeker after virtue and truth, keen in argument and cautious in decision. Xenophon says he was a member of Socrates' inner circle, and a frequent visitor to the hetaera, Theodote, in Athens. He is also mentioned by Plato in the Crito and Epistle XIII.

Three dialogues, the Hebdome, the Phrynichus, and the Pinax (Πίναξ) or Tabula, are attributed to him by the Suda and Diogenes Laërtius. The two former are lost, and most scholars deny the authenticity of the Tabula on the ground of material and verbal anachronisms.

== The Tablet of Cebes ==
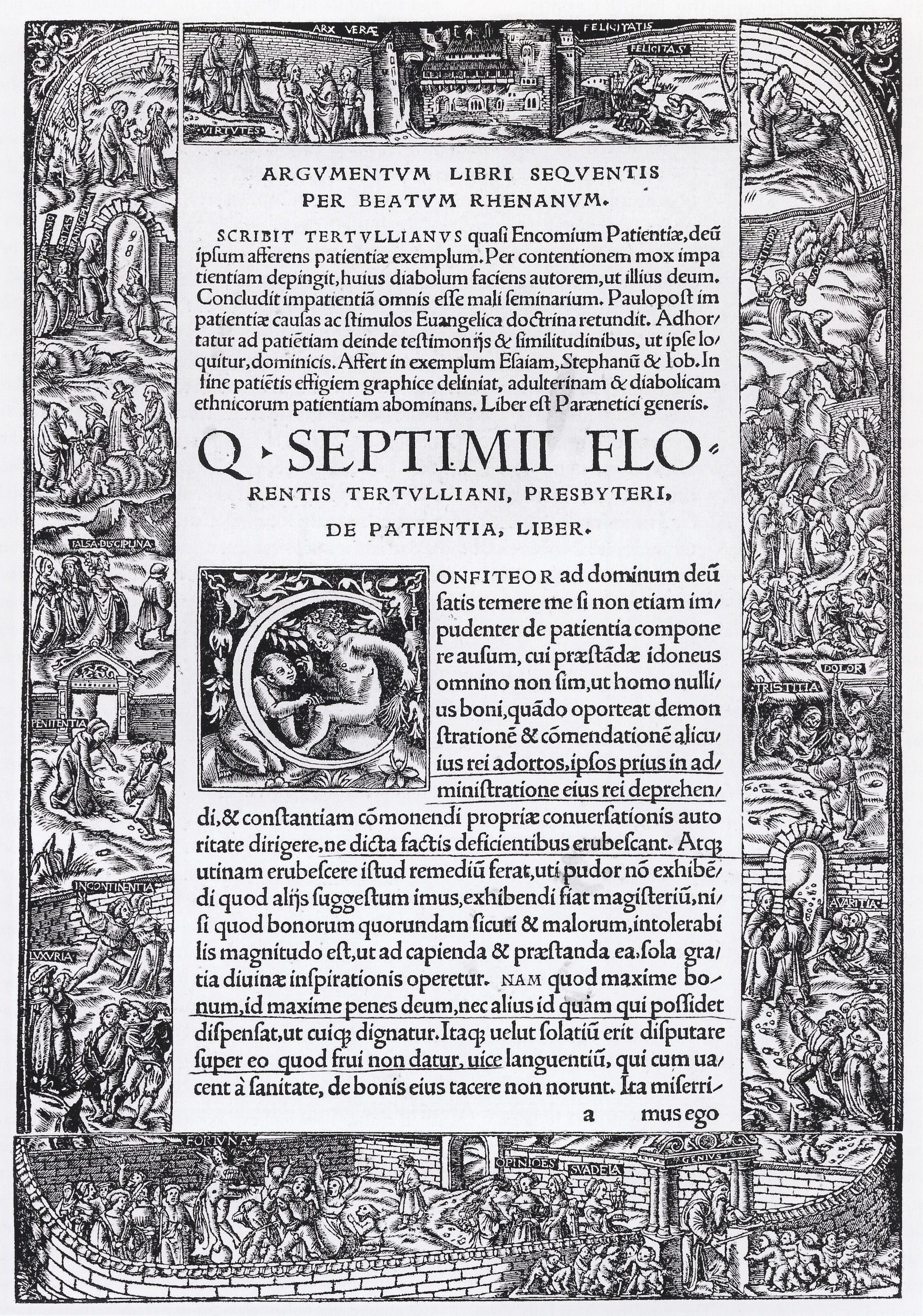
Title page with the Tablet of Cebes, by Hans Holbein the Younger, 1521. Metalcut by Jacob Faber.

The Tablet of Cebes is probably by a pseudonymous author of the 1st or 2nd century. The work professes to be an interpretation of an allegorical picture of a tablet on which the whole of human life with its dangers and temptations was symbolically represented, and which is said to have been dedicated by someone in the temple of Cronus at Athens or Thebes. The author introduces some youths contemplating the tablet, and an old man who steps among them undertakes to explain its meaning. It is intended to show that only the proper development of our mind and the possession of real virtues can make us truly happy. The author develops the Platonic theory of pre-existence, and shows that true education consists not in mere erudition, but rather in the formation of character. Parallels are often drawn between this work and John Bunyan's The Pilgrim's Progress.

The Tabula has been widely translated both into European languages and into Arabic (the latter version published with the Greek text and Latin translation by Claudius Salmasius in 1640). It has often been printed together with the Enchiridion of Epictetus. Separate editions have been issued by CS Jerram (with introduction and notes, 1878), Karl Praechter (1893), and many others. An English translation and commentary by John T. Fitzgerald and L. Michael White was published in 1983.

== See also ==
- List of speakers in Plato's dialogues
