= Simmias of Thebes =

Ancient Greek Socratic philosopher

- Σιμμίας Θηβαῖος
- Born: c. 430s BCE; Thebes

Philosophical work
- School: Socratic

Simmias of Thebes (Ancient Greek: Σιμμίας Θηβαῖος; fl. 5th–4th century BC) was an ancient Greek philosopher, disciple of Socrates, and a friend of Cebes. In his Memorabilia, Xenophon includes him in the inner circle of Socrates' followers. He appears in Plato's Phaedo as a main discussion partner of Socrates alongside Cebes, as well as Crito, Phaedrus, and Epistle XIII.

In addition to the references in Plato and Xenophon, Diogenes Laërtius mentions Simmias as the author of 23 brief dialogues, now lost, including On Philosophy and On Music. Simmias appears as a character in Plutarch's De Genio Socratis section of the Moralia. A pseudepigraphic letter from Xenophon to Simmias and Cebes is included in the Cynic epistles attributed to Socrates' followers. Two short works are also attributed to him in the Greek Anthology, a couplet on Sophocles and an epitaph on Plato.

== Character in Plato's Phaedo ==
Simmias is one of Socrates' interlocutors in Plato's Phaedo. This is a philosophical dialogue by Plato, so the analogy presented in it by the character Simmias, although summarized here, need not reflect the views of the historical Simmias.

Simmias' attunement analogy

1. Body is visible, composite and mortal.
2. A harp is visible, composite and mortal.
3. When the harp is destroyed the tune which is ethereal, invisible and divine is also destroyed.
4. The soul is like a tune (harmonia) of the parts of the body. If the body is destroyed, the tune cannot survive.

Socrates attacks Simmias's Analogy with four different arguments:

1. Harmonia-argument would be a contradiction to the anamnesis-argument that Simmias had already agreed on before.
2. If the soul would be a tune, and bodies can be tuned differently, there would be more or lesser souls - which is not possible.
3. Virtue is the proper attunement of the soul, and vice the lack of such an attunement. But if the soul itself is an attunement, then virtue and vice would be attunements of an attunement. But an attunement can't participate in non-attunement. So if a soul is a perfect attunement, it could not have virtue or vice.
4. The soul is the ruling principle of the body. But attunement is governed by the material of the musical instrument. By analogy, that would make the body the ruler of the soul.

Thus, Simmias' argument cannot be upheld.

== See also ==
- List of speakers in Plato's dialogues
