= Myrmidon =

Myrmidon or Myrmidons may refer to:

== Greek mythology ==
- Myrmidons, an ancient nation of Greek mythology
- Myrmidon (hero), the eponymous ancestor of the mythological Myrmidons
- Myrmidons, part of the lost tragedy Achilleis by Greek playwright Aeschylus

== Modern fiction ==
- Sergeant Myrmidon, a character from The Ballad of Halo Jones
- A race in the game Myth: The Fallen Lords
- A fictional monster from the book Shade's Children
- The terrorist/military wing of a religious cult from the 2012 video game Zero Escape: Virtue's Last Reward
- One name for a mysterious race of humanoids in the game Dragon's Dogma
- A character class in the Nintendo video game series Fire Emblem
- A warrior type of the Naga race in the Warcraft franchise
- A type of elemental monster in Dungeons & Dragons, introduced in the 4th edition of the game

== Vessels ==
- HMS Myrmidon, the name of several British ships
- USS Myrmidon, a tank landing ship of the United States Navy

== Other uses ==
- Myrmidon of Athens, an Athenian commander of the 4th century BC
- Myrmidon Club, a dining club at Merton College, University of Oxford
- Operation Myrmidon, a planned raid during the Second World War on the Adour Estuary in south-western France
- Myrmidons of Melodrama, a compilation album by American pop girl group The Shangri-Las

== See also ==
- Myrmidone, a feminine name attributed to two characters in Greek mythology
