= Phanostratê =

Physician from the Hellenistic period

- Born: 5th or 4th century BC; Attica, (Greece)
- Died: Between 360 B.C. and 340 B.C. Melite, (Greece)
- Citizenship: Athenian (?)
- Occupations: Midwife, physician

Phanostratê (in ancient Greek: Φανοστράτη / Phanostrátē) was a Greek midwife and physician from the Hellenistic period, who lived in the 4th century BCE in the deme of Melite (Attica). Modern historians are only aware of her existence through two stelae created between 360 BCE and 340 BCE. Based on the available documentation, she is identified as the first woman to be referred to as "doctor" (ἰατρὸς / iatros (Note: The feminine form iatreinê or iatrine is only attested from the 2nd and 1st centuries BC, on the funerary stele of Mousa, daughter of Agathocles, found in Istanbul.)) in the History of Ancient Greece.

A paucity of available information precludes a definitive determination of Phanostratê's origins and social status. It is plausible that she was a mother and post-menopausal, as the philosopher Socrates required of a midwife at that time. Additionally, she must have possessed considerable expertise in the medical arts to practice in other areas of healthcare.

The reference to a statue of Phanostratê in the Asclepieion in Athens, now lost, testifies to the local prominence and reputation she enjoyed during that period.

== Stelae attesting to the existence of Phanostratê ==
Phanostratê is known from two marble stelae dating from the 4th century BCE, which can be dated to approximately between 360 BCE and 340 BCE. The first is a funerary stele, discovered in Menidi, currently housed in the National Archaeological Museum of Athens, and cataloged under inventory number NM 993. It is referenced in epigraphic directories as IG II/III² 6873. The second stele, which was discovered on the southern slope of the Acropolis of Athens, is a monument of gratitude for her services. It is currently housed in the Epigraphic Museum and bears the inventory number 9007. In epigraphic directories, it is referenced as IG II³ 4 7001.

=== Stele from Menídi ===
The stele IG II/III² 6873 is a bas-relief depicting two women and four children, accompanied by inscriptions. The inscription above the bas-relief reads:

Φανοσ[τράτη ---,---]

Με[λιτέως]

Phanostratê, [daughter or wife of ---],

from the deme of Melite.

— Trans. by Véronique Dasen.

In the bas-relief, the name Antiphilê (Ἀντιφίλη) is inscribed above the woman standing on the left, and Phanostratê (Φανοστράτη) above the seated woman on the right. The dactylic hexameter inscription below the bas-relief reads as follows:

Μαῖα καὶ ἰατρὸς Φανοστράτη ἐνθάδε κεῖται

[ο]ὐθενὶ λυπη<ρ>ά, πᾶσιν δὲ θανοῦσα ποθεινή.

Maia and iatros Phanostratê lie here,

causing no grief to anyone, mourned by all in death.

— Trans. by Véronique Dasen.

Phanostratê is depicted in a seated position on a klismos (on the right) and shaking hands with Antiphilê (on the left, in a codified pose expressing sadness), both clothed in a chiton and himation. The nature of the relationship between the two women is not specified, leading to a variety of hypotheses regarding their possible connection. These include the possibilities of friendship, kinship, patronage, clientele, or professional collaboration. It seems highly probable that this is one of her close companions, perhaps the individual responsible for commissioning the stele in honor of the deceased. In 1972, Georges Daux was the first to accurately reconstruct the text of the stele and identify the name Antiphilê. This enabled him to ascertain that Phanostratê is the name of the seated woman, as previous scholars had assumed that both women were named the same.

The scene is accompanied by four small children, an unusual number for a funerary stele. Antiphilê is situated between two young girls who direct their gaze towards her. Phanostratê is accompanied by two children of indeterminate sex: one to her right (presumably a girl) is positioned behind her chair, while the other is crouching below. These children may be Phanostratê's, Antiphilê's, or perhaps those of another woman whom the midwife helped deliver and care for. V. Dasen posits that "the children might also serve as attributes of Phanostratê's competence at a second level, designating her as a successful mother, in line with Socrates' description recommending midwives to be women who have given birth" to oversee deliveries.

In contrast with the funerary stelae of male physicians in ancient Greece, Phanostratê's stele lacks any indications of her status as a citizen or physician (no instruments, gestures, attire, or distinctive accessories). However, the bas-relief bears resemblance to those depicting wet nurses (τίτθη / titthê), exhibiting similarities in the figures, clothing, and postures. The profession of these nurses is identifiable only through the inscription beneath the bas-relief. This proximity led Christoph W. Clairmont in 1970 to erroneously categorize the funerary monument among those of wet nurses, interpreting the word "maia" in this sense and completely overlooking her role as a midwife.

=== Stele from Athens ===
The masculine name Phanostratos (Φανόστρατος) on the gratitude stele found in Athens was long misread until Jaime Curbera demonstrated the error in 2017. He was the first to suggest that it refers to the same Phanostratê named on the Menidi funerary stele, a hypothesis that was later deemed "plausible" by subsequent research.

Φανόστρατη [---].

Δηλοφάνης ἀνέθηκε Χο[λαργεὺς εἰκόνα τήνδε], τῆς αὑτοῦ θυγατρὸς Δ[--- εὐξαμένης]. Λυσιμάχηι γὰρ μητρὶ [---] χεῖρα μέγας σωτὴρ [---]

ἐπὶ Πατ[αίκου ἱερέως].

"Phanostratê [---].

Delophanès of Cholargos dedicated [this image], his own daughter D[--- having vowed it], for [her?] mother Lysimachê [---], [you placed your?] hand, great savior [---],

during the priesthood of Pat[aïkos]."

— Trans. by Stephen Lambert

The inscription was created during the tenure of a priest named Pataïkos, which would place it before 343–342 BCE, according to Sara Aleshire. Despite the lack of contextual information, it is evident that Phanostratê is thanked for assisting a woman named Lysimachê, the wife of Delophanès of Cholargós (a deme six kilometers northwest of Athens) and mother of a daughter, whose name begins with a delta and is otherwise unknown.

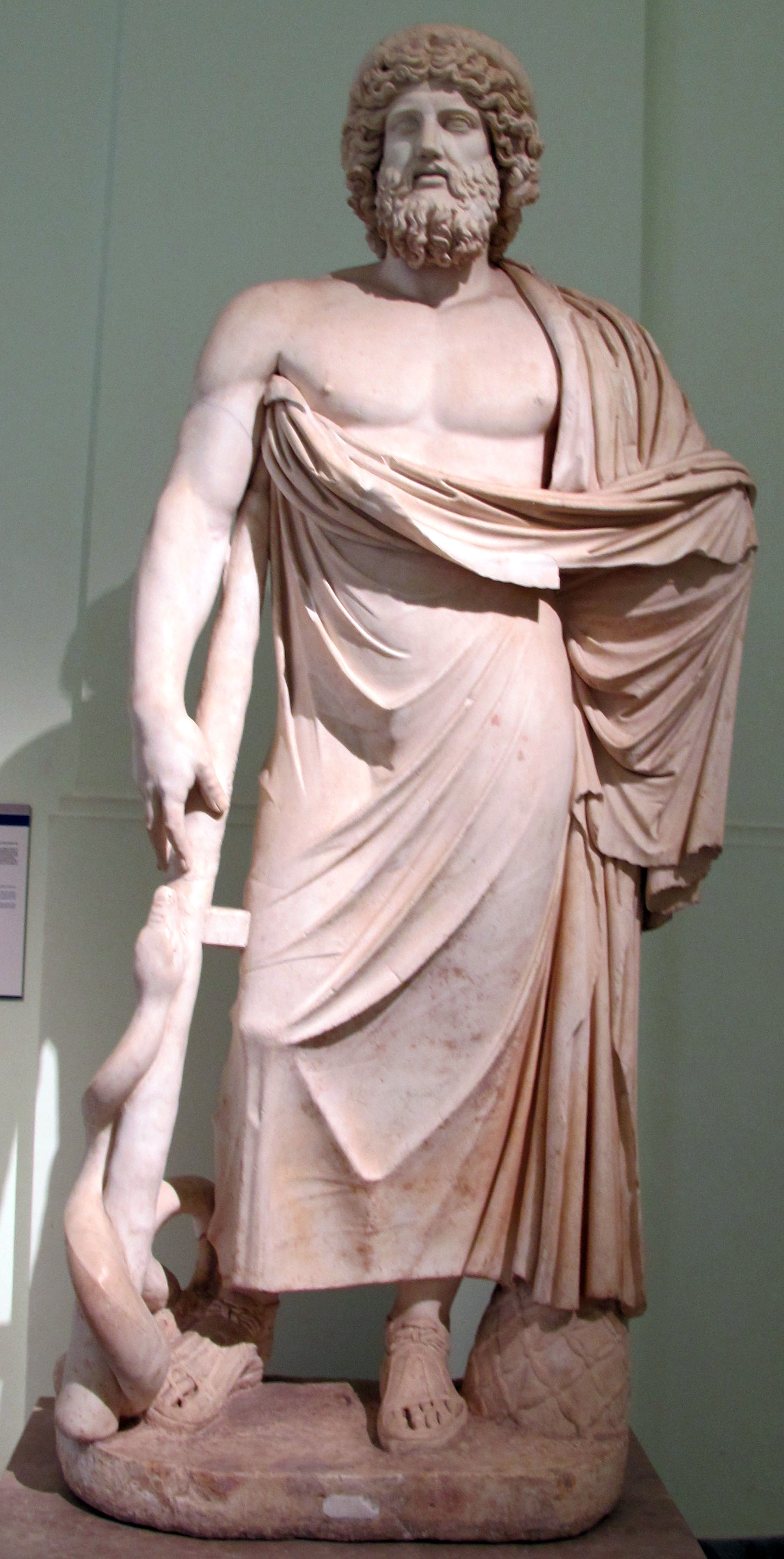
Statue of Asclepius, the Greek god of medicine. Roman copy dating from 100 to 150 BC, based on a Greek original from the late 4th century BC (Naples Archaeological Museum). – On the thank-you stele found in Athens, Asclepius is referred to as the "great savior" to whom Phanostratê's patient owes her recovery.

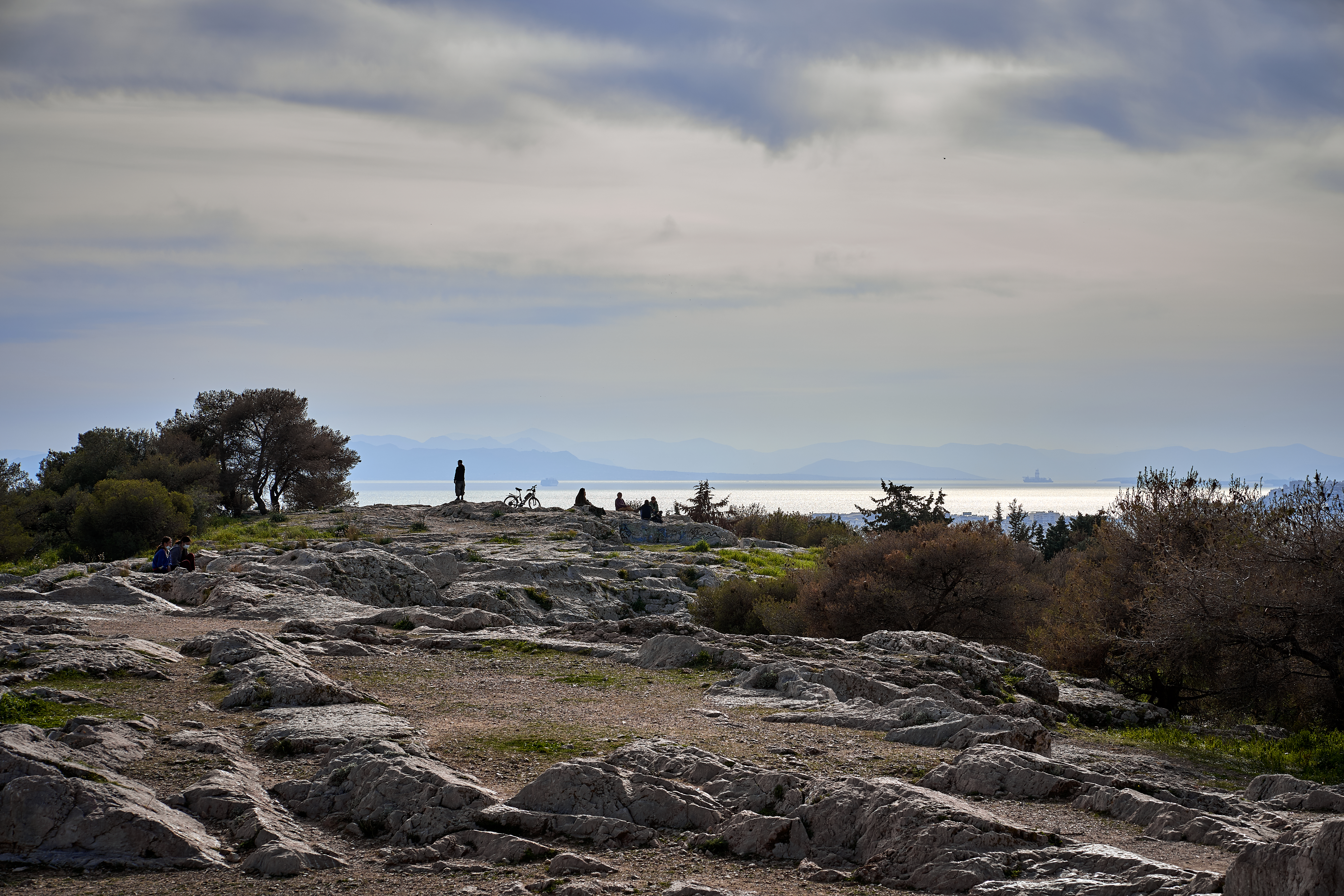
Plateau of the ancient demesne of Melité, in Attica, from which Phanostratê originated according to several interpretations.

The stele refers to a statue that has yet to be discovered. The text indicates that the statue was in the likeness of Phanostratê, which allows us to estimate the importance that the midwife held in her society. Having a statue in the Asclepieion was indeed a significant and rare honor for a physician. The existence of this statue demonstrates that healers were held in high regard and could be bestowed with the same honors as those reserved for men. Nevertheless, Phanostratê's healing abilities are eclipsed by the "great savior" of Lysimachê, who is Asclepius, the god of medicine. It is probable that Phanostratê, like other members of the ancient Greek medical community, had a profound devotion to him.

== Biographical theories ==
=== Origins and social status ===
The available evidence regarding Phanostratê's life is limited to the various interpretations of the stelae presented above. The reconstruction of the name "Meliteos" by G. Daux is widely accepted; however, in 2014, Rebecca Futo Kennedy put forth alternative possibilities (Μελιταίς / Mélitaís, Μελιταιέως / Mélitaiéos ou Μιλησια / Milesia) that may indicate that Phanostratê was a metic, a rare mention on women's tombstones of her time.

F. Retief and L. Cilliers posit that she was from Acharnae (a town in Attica) and that she married a Milesian citizen. (Note: Retief & Cilliers 2005, p. 169) While concurring with the aforementioned scholars that she was a free woman, as opposed to a slave, V. Dasen is less certain about Phanostratê's origins. Dasen hypothesizes that Phanostratê may have been the daughter or wife of an Athenian citizen from the deme of Melite. For S. Lambert and L. Totelin, even though Phanostratê is depicted on her funerary stele as a woman of high social standing, this does not rule out the possibility that she was, at least temporarily, a slave of a Melitian. This social status would not have precluded her from undertaking significant responsibilities. This hypothesis posits that the name following Phanostratê's is not that of her husband or father, but rather that of her owner. For D. N. Theocharis, Phanostratê's unique status as a midwife and physician in classical antiquity, particularly in Athens, may be attributed to her belonging to a family of local notables and having amassed considerable wealth, which could explain the recognition she received.

It can be reasonably assumed that A. Bielman Sanchez, Phanostratê, had children and was postmenopausal when she began her practice as a midwife. This is based on the understanding that these were the essential prerequisites for midwifery, as outlined by Socrates. However, this theory is challenged by H. Cremo, who notes the existence of alternative midwifery models besides that of Phaenarète, the philosopher's mother. To account for the anomalous absence of males in the bas-relief, A. Bielman Sanchez posits that Phanostratê was "likely a widow", lacking both a spouse and progeny and that she was "wholly devoted to her profession." Consequently, the absence of a name above the bas-relief may signify her lineage. Given that the stele IG II/III² 6873 was discovered in Acharnae, Phanostratê possibly resided and practiced medicine in this town without the supervision of men, which would have been an exceptional social position for a woman of her time.

=== Studies and medical skills ===
The available evidence suggests that less than 5% of Athenian women from this period could read. However, it is probable that a wealthy professional or the wife of a rich Athenian, as Phanostratê might have been, belonged to this minority. Historians rely on Xenophon's testimony, as presented in Oeconomicus, which assigns the wife the responsibility of overseeing the health of the household members (children, servants, and slaves). This responsibility was likely not distinguished by gender. The boundary between midwife and physician was blurred, depending on personal choice, as there were no laws defining these professions.

It appears that Phanostratê's areas of expertise were in the fields of women's and children's health. Her case is of particular interest as she is described as a midwife, and thus represents the first instance of a woman being referred to as a "physician" in ancient Greek sources. The reference is as follows: The phrase "all mourn her at her death" indicates that her expertise was not limited to the family sphere and that she was a well-rounded practitioner of her field. Given the use of this title and the existence of examples of physicians following her, it seems plausible that Phanostratê also treated male patients. In addition to the title of "physician", the assumption of an extended clientele for Phanostratê is supported by the references to her healing a resident of another deme, the lost statue erected in her honor at the Asclepieion, and the hypothesis that Antiphilê may have been a client. (Note: Retief & Cilliers 2005, p. 174)

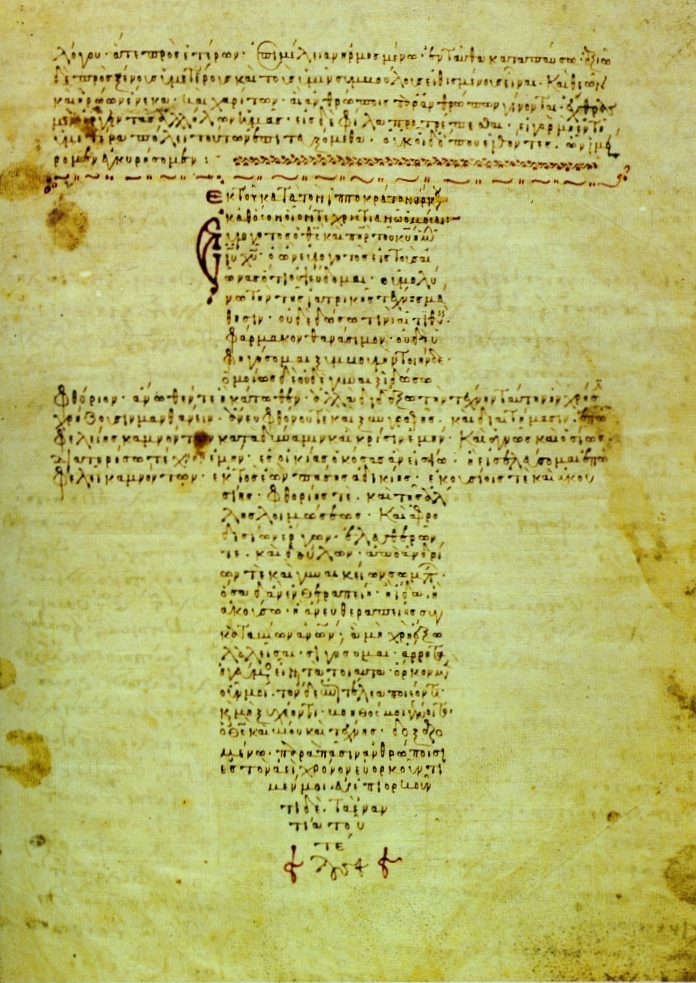
Hippocratic Oath, 12th-century Byzantine manuscript.

In the view of Lesley Dean-Jones, the term iatros appears to denote the daughters of physicians who, like their male siblings, underwent comparable training in medicine to that received by their male counterparts. Men held considerable sway over the field of medicine, and women typically served in an auxiliary capacity, assisting them in the examination of female patients. In the view of L. Dean-Jones, Phanostratê "masculinized" herself by taking the Hippocratic Oath. As was the case with other highly educated women in medicine, she would have personally claimed the title "physician." This masculinization is reflected in the phrase pasin poteiné ("all mourn her"), which is predominantly found in male epitaphs. The use of masculine epitaph formulas and a masculine title is not inconsequential; it serves to legitimize her position in a medical community that is predominantly male, without her renouncing her femininity, as evidenced by the bas-relief on her funerary stele.

The appearance of the term lupêra (λυπηρά) in Phanostratê's funerary inscription may be more than mere coincidence. It is conceivable that she was aware of the discourse surrounding the term lupê. (λύπη) — grief or sorrow, which should be avoided for all, particularly patients – and that she engaged in discussions with colleagues regarding its treatment. It is not implausible that a female physician would have been acquainted with Homer's Iliad, Euripides' Hippolytus, and the Hippocratic treatise On Airs, Waters, and Places, which address the concept of lupê. The epitaph serves to exonerate Phanostratê from any implication of causing distress to a patient during her lifetime. It appears to assert that she consistently sought to alleviate or relieve pain, in alignment with the core tenet of the medical profession as articulated in Epidemics, another text within the Hippocratic corpus.

It is possible that Phanostratê was unable to read, yet she may have been conversant with the prevailing theories on the subject. This is particularly so given that Hippocratic medicine was, in certain respects, analogous to culinary art, in that it was based on the empirical observation of transformative processes and the timing of interventions.

== Honor ==
The asteroid (20051) Phanostrate has been designated as a tribute to her.

== See also ==
- Women in Greece
- Women in medicine
- Ancient Greek medicine
- On Ancient Medicine
- Physician

== Bibliography ==
- Daux, Georges (1972). "Stèles funéraires et épigrammes". Bulletin de Correspondance Hellénique (in French). 96 (1): 550–554. doi:10.3406/bch.1972.2146. Archived from the original on 13 July 2024.
- Dasen, Véronique (2016). "L'ars medica au féminin" (PDF). Eugesta: Revue sur le Genre dans l'Antiquité (in French) (6): 1–40. Archived from the original (PDF) on 21 September 2023.
- Sebillotte, Violaine (2019). "Phanostratê, médecin". Eurykleia (in French). doi:10.58079/om6p. Archived from the original on 13 July 2024.
- Cremo, Hannah (2022). "Phanostrate and the Legitimization of Professional Female Healers in Fourth Century Athens". Senior Projects Fall 2021. Archived from the original on 4 March 2024.
- Totelin, Laurence (2020). "Do no harm: Phanostrate's midwifery practice" (PDF). Technai. Archived from the original (PDF) on 30 May 2024.
- Retief, F; Cilliers, L (2005). "The healing hand : the role of women in ancient medicine : the Graeco-Roman world". Acta Theologica Supplementum. doi:10.4314/actat.v26i2.52571. Archived from the original on 8 August 2023.
- Castelli, Hélène (2019). "Les gestes d'Hécamède. Femmes pourvoyeuses de soin en Grèce archaïque et classique". Clio. Femmes, Genre, Histoire (in French). 49 (1): 23–42. doi:10.4000/clio.16066. ISSN 1252-7017. Archived from the original on 5 October 2024.
- Theocharis, Dimitrios N (2020). "Women in medicine : an epigraphic research" (PDF). CHS Research Bulletin: 1–40. Archived from the original (PDF) on 15 May 2024.
- Massar, Natacha (2016). "À la vie, à la mort. Les monuments funéraires de médecins de langue grecque, du VIe au Ier siècle avant notre ère". Histoire, médecine et santé (in French) (8): 17–30. doi:10.4000/hms.843. ISSN 2263-8911. Archived from the original on 9 September 2023.
- Gazzaniga, Valentina (1997). "Phanostrate, Metrodora, Lais and the others. Women in the medical profession". Medicina Nei Secoli. 9 (2): 277–290. PMID 11619961. Archived from the original on 8 August 2023.
