= Melite =

Melite may refer to:

- Melite (ancient city), an ancient Punic-Roman city located on Malta, or a Greco-Roman reference to the island on which the city was located
- Melite (Attica), one of the demes of ancient Attica
- Melite, ancient name of Lake Trichonida in Greece
- Melite, the ancient name of Mljet island
- Melite (Greek mythology)
- Melite (heroine)
- Melite (naiad)
- Melite, version 4.5 of 98lite, a customized version of Windows Me

== See also ==
- Mélite, a 1629 play by Pierre Corneille
- Mellite aka "honey stone", a type of mineral
