= Sophroniscus =

Sculptor and father of Socrates

Sophroniscus (Greek: Σωφρονίσκος, Sophroniskos), husband of Phaenarete, was the father of the philosopher Socrates.

== Occupation ==
Little is known about Sophroniscus and his relationship with his son Socrates. According to tradition, Sophroniscus was by trade a stonemason or sculptor. Plato scholars Thomas Brickhouse and Nicholas D. Smith question the authenticity of that tradition, mainly on the grounds that the earliest extant sources of the story are comparatively late and that it is unmentioned by more reliable sources such as Plato, Xenophon, Aristophanes, or Aristotle. According to John Burnet, the earliest extant mention of Socrates as a statuary or stonemason is in Timon of Philius, as quoted by Diogenes Laërtius 2.19. Burnet claims that Timon "is a very unsafe authority for anything", and that the attribution "appears to have arisen from an almost certainly false interpretation of [Socrates'] references to Daedalus as the ancestor of his family" (in Plato's Euthyphro 11c, 15b). Burnet points out that Daedalus had nothing to do with stone-cutting or marble sculpture; his media were instead metal and wood. Burnet furthermore argues that Xenophon and Plato would at some point have explicitly mentioned Socrates' background in stone-craftsmanship, if it were real, since both writers so often make Socrates mention craftsmen. Another early source of the claim that Socrates was a stone-worker is Duris of Samos, who described Socrates as a slave. According to Eduard Zeller, Duris seems to have confused Socrates with Phaedo of Elis.

In direct contradiction to Plato's Crito 50d-e, one scholar of ancient Greek music has claimed that "Socrates received no training in mousikē in boyhood...", based on the assumption that "[h]is father, a stonemason, was typical of a class that did not receive a training in mousikē."

== Family connections ==
According to Plato (in the dialogue Laches), Sophroniscus was a close friend of Lysimachus, son of the illustrious Aristides the Just, which (presumably) allowed Socrates to become familiar with members of the circle of Pericles. (Since Plato has Lysimachus refer to Sophroniscus in the past tense, and since the dialogue's dramatic date is not long after the battle of Delium, we may safely infer that Sophroniscus was dead by 424.) The fact that one of Socrates' sons — but not his eldest son Lamprocles — was named after Sophroniscus suggests that Sophroniscus was the less illustrious of the two grandfathers (John Burnet 1911, Plato: Phaedo, p. 12); the father of Socrates' wife, Xanthippe, was named Lamprocles and had a more impressive pedigree than Sophroniscus. All this suggests that Socrates' inherited social status was in fact much higher than is traditionally recognized.
