= List of University of Oxford dining clubs =

This is a list of current University of Oxford dining clubs. All are social in nature and recruit members by private invitation for a programme of drinking and dining. Members are drawn exclusively from the student body of the University of Oxford. Most have individual costumes and traditions and maintain a high degree of secrecy concerning their membership and activities.

== University wide ==
- The Assassins (known for their debauchery in the 1980s; not to be confused with the unrelated student society, Oxford Guild of Assassins)
- The Bullingdon Club (founded 1780; dress in navy blue tailcoats, with navy velvet collar, ivory silk lapels, brass buttons, mustard waistcoat, and a sky-blue bow tie; club tie is sky blue striped with ivory; sometimes called The Buller; male society)
- The Delilahs (female society)
- The Drater Club (mixed gender society, oriented toward neurodiversity and anti-elitist humour, dress in white tie and red loafers)
- The Gridiron Club (founded 1884; commonly called The Grid; club tie is dark blue with white gridirons; mixed gender society)
- The Piers Gaveston Society (founded 1977; limited to 12 members; mixed gender society)
- The Stoics (dress in black tailcoats, with bi-coloured socks, braces, and bow ties of blue and yellow; male society)
- The Viceroys (dress in black tailcoats, with bow ties of purple with yellow and blue stripes; male society)
- The 9th Prime Club (postgraduates only, mixed gender society)

== College based ==
- The Abbotts, Corpus Christi (male society)
- The Ace of Spades, St Edmund Hall (male society)
- The Alices, Christ Church (female society)
- L’Ancien Régime, Merton (mixed gender society)
- The Black Cygnets, St Hugh's (male society - members wear white bowties with cygnet motif; organise 'fox hunt')
- Bugger Ruggers, St Edmund Hall (female society)
- The Cardinals, Christ Church (male society)
- The Carolines, New College (female society)
- The Claret Club, Trinity (male society)
- The D'Avenant Society, Lincoln (mixed gender society)
- The Dolphins, Jesus (female society)
- The Dinos, New College (male society)
- The Eaglets, The Queen's (male society)
- The Elizabethan Society, Jesus (male society)
- The Faeries, Lincoln (female society)
- Flowers and Fairies, Christ Church (female society)
- The GC, University College (possibly named after George Cawkwell)
- The George
- The Goblin Club, Lincoln (founded 1902; limited to between 12 and 15 members; extensive silverware collection; club tie in colours of port, champagne, and claret; male society)
- The Halcyon Club, The Queen's (mixed gender society)
- The King Charles Club, St John's (claims to be the oldest University dining club; club tie is black, with stripes of pacific blue edged with gold; male society)
- The Loder, Christ Church (members drink only from 18th-century silver goblets, male society)
- The Missionaries, Magdalen (male society)
- The Mantis, Magdalen (female society)
- The Mercurials, Christ Church (male society)
- The Millers, Oriel (male and female society)
- The Myrmidon Club, Merton (founded 1865, mixed gender society)
- The Myrmaids, Merton (female society)
- The Musketeers, Oriel (male society)
- The Nicholites, Wadham College
- The Nondescripts Club, Christ Church (male society)
- The Owls' Club, Brasenose (founded pre-1854, dedicated to 'chat and dessert after hall'; male and female society)
- The Penguin Club, Hertford (possibly defunct; male society)
- The Phoenix Club, Brasenose (claims to be the oldest University dining club; dress in brown tailcoats, and dine with a silver phoenix at the table; limited to 12 members; male society)
- The Preprandials Society, New College (mixed gender society)
- The Pythic Club, Christ Church (founded by 1845)
- The Regent's Rabbits, Regent's Park College (female society)
- The Reginae Society, The Queen's (female society)
- The Shakespeare Club, University College(founded 1876; mixed-gender society after 1979)
- The Sir Henry Pelham Gentleman's Sporting Society, Hertford (commonly known as Pelhams; male society)
- Somerville Ladies Ultimate Tequila Society, Somerville (female society)
- The Steamers, Keble (male society)
- The Syndicate, St Edmund Hall (male society)
- The Wardens, Merton (mixed gender society)
