= Myrmex =

Myrmex may refer to:

- Myrmex (beetle), a genus of beetles in the family Curculionidae, Snout and Bark beetles
- Myrmex, former name of the genus of ants now called Pseudomyrmex
- Myrmex (mythology) may refer to different figures in Greek mythology
- Myrmex, an ancient Greek philosopher noted as a convert to the teachings of Stilpo
