= Women in Greece =

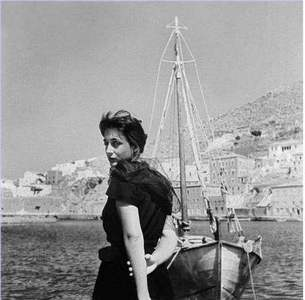
- Ellie Lambeti, Greek actress

General statistics
- Maternal mortality (per 100,000): 8 (2020)
- Women in parliament: 21.0% (2013)
- Women over 25 with secondary education: 59.5% (2012)
- Women in labour force: 47.3% (employment rate OECD definition, 2019)

Gender Inequality Index
- Value: 0.119
- Rank: 32nd out of 191

Global Gender Gap Index
- Value: 0.689 (2022)
- Rank: 100th out of 146

The lives of modern women in Greece have evolved significantly from ancient times, when Thucydides described "the greatest glory" for women was "to be least talked about among men, whether in praise or blame." The status of Greek women underwent considerable change and advancement in the 20th century. In 1890, the first woman was admitted to the University of Athens. In 1952, women received the right to vote, and increased political participation and educational access led to expanded employment opportunities.

== Women in Bronze Age Greece ==
According to classics professor Anna Judson in "Women in Mycenaean Greece," in the Linear B tablets from this era, men are more frequently mentioned by name, title, or occupation. Nonetheless, Judson says the references to women offer valuable clues about their roles within palace-controlled economies. Many women are organized into workgroups under palace authority, classified by roles such as textile workers ("linen workers", "sewing women", "headband makers"), food producers ("flour-grinders"), and domestic staff ("attendants"). Some women are identified by their origins, which could be local to the palace or from more distant regions—for instance, records from Pylos in southwestern Greece list women from as far away as the Anatolian coast.

Though these women are not often directly referred to as enslaved, the details of their origins, references to some groups as "captives", and the palace's regulation of their lives and labor suggest they were likely in a state of effective enslavement or, at the very least, heavily dependent on palace authority. Within this category, some enslaved women were sex workers, while others labored in bakeries or shops.

Women of this social standing are seldom identified by name, but there are a few notable exceptions. For example, a tablet from Knossos on Crete lists a group of women—likely textile workers—by individual names, including one named Wordieya, or "Rosie". Another tablet from Pylos records a woman named Kessandra as the recipient of a substantial ration allocation, enough to support 20 workers for 20 days.

== Women in ancient Greece ==
Although most women lacked political and equal rights in Ancient Greece, they enjoyed a certain freedom of movement until the Archaic age. Records exist of women in ancient Delphi, Gortyn, Thessaly, Megara and Sparta owning land, the only durable form of wealth at the time. However, after the Archaic age, women's status worsened, and laws on gender segregation were implemented. In general, Classical Greek women were expected to manage a household, supervising or performing domestic tasks such as weaving cloth, and caring for children. Women entered arranged marriages around age 15. Historian Don Nardo stated "throughout antiquity most Greek women had few or no civil rights and many enjoyed little freedom of choice or mobility."

Detailed records on the status of women in Ancient Greece only describe the behavior and treatment of elites, and have survived for only three poleis: Sparta, Athens and Gortyn. As those states were exceptional in the Greek world, it is unclear how much can be generalized from these records.

=== In Athens ===
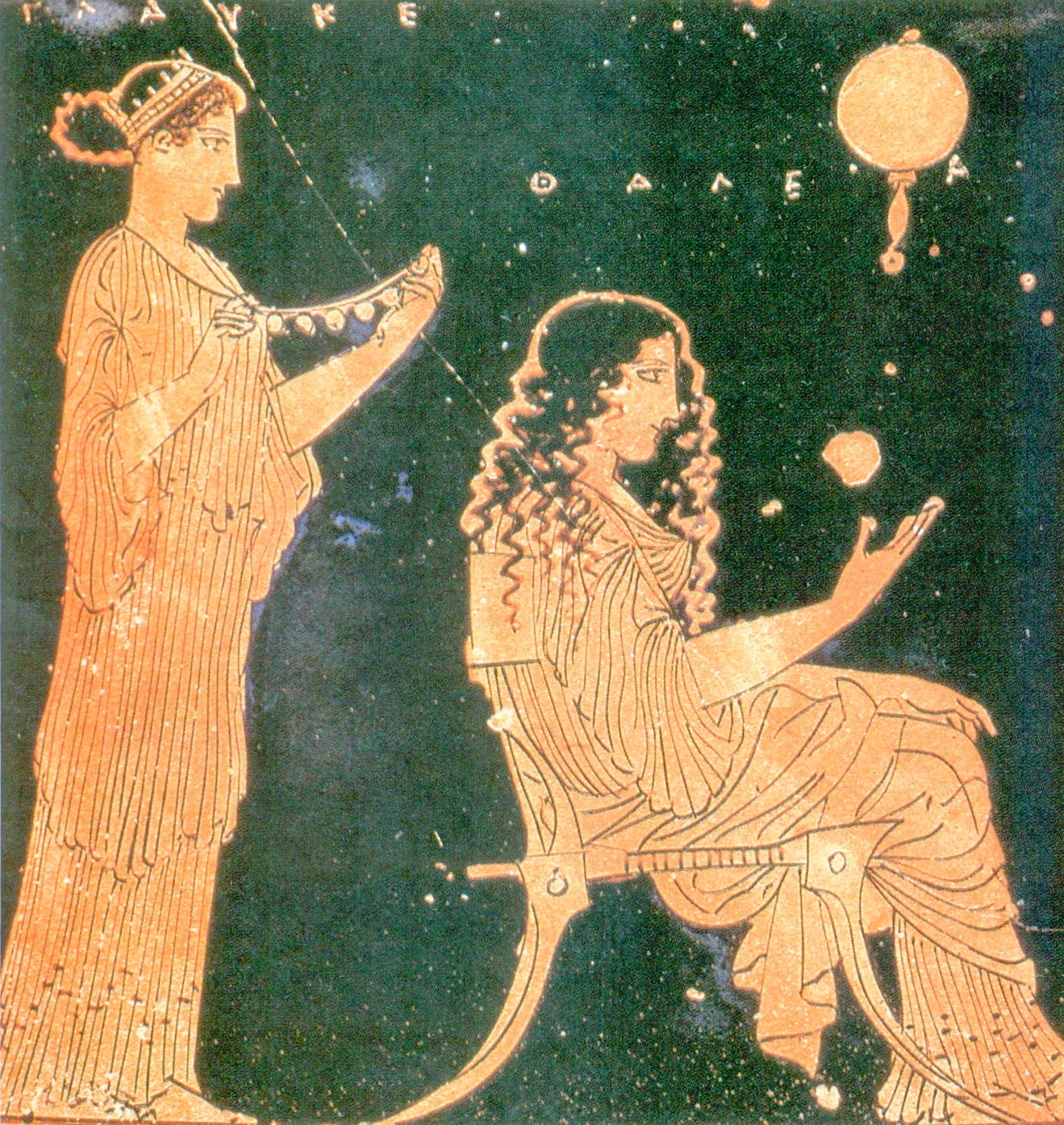
Athenian women preparing for a wedding (ceramic painting, 5th century BC)

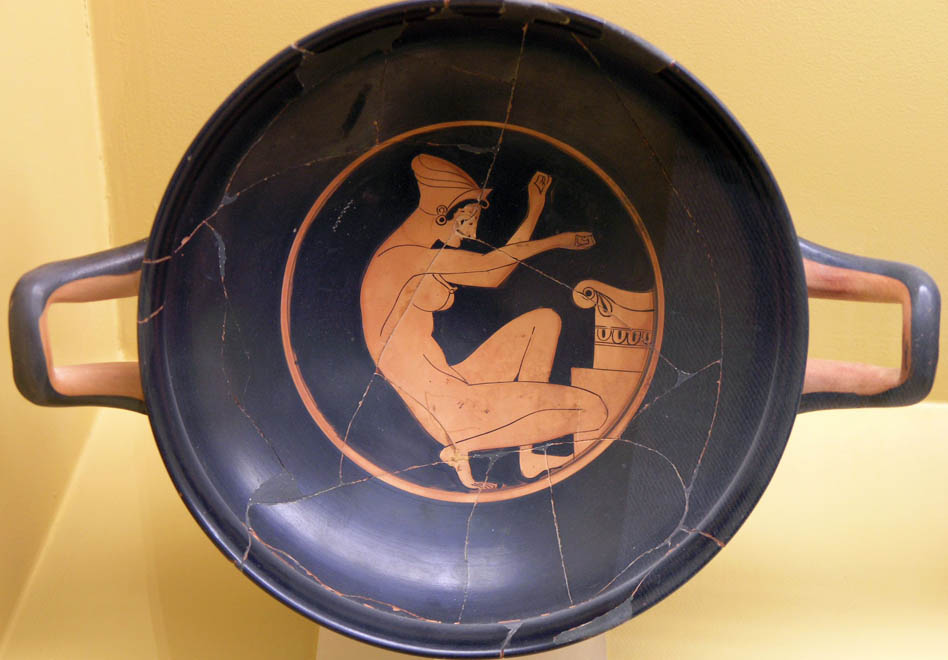
Woman kneeling before an altar (Attic red-figure kylix, 5th BC, Stoa of Attalos)

Women in Classical Athens had no legal personhood and were assumed to be part of the oikos (household) headed by the male kyrios (master). In Athenian society, the legal term of a wife was known as a damar, a word that is derived from the root meaning of "to subdue" or "to tame". Until marriage, women were under the guardianship of their fathers or other male relatives; once married, the husband became a woman's kyrios. Women typically married around age 14 to a husband about twice their age. The girl's kyrios typically selected her husband; she would have little input. Often, the kyrios selected a different male relative to ensure that any inherited property remained within the family. Additionally, it was illegal at the time, for citizens of Athens to marry non-Athenians. If caught, non-Athenian women could be sold into slavery as punishment, and men were fined heavily. In more severe circumstances, disenfranchisement was another punishment.

Classical Athens idealized extreme female seclusion. Legal records suggest that respectable women may have been embarrassed in the presence of their male relatives or for an unrelated man to simply know their name. Such seclusion was likely impractical for all but the wealthy, as domestic tasks such as fetching water required entering public spaces.

Nevertheless, Athenian women were excluded from essentially all public life. Their gender acted as a permanent disability inhibiting full citizenship, similar to enslavement but without a removal process analogous to manumission. Women were barred from conducting legal proceedings, and their kyrios would represent them instead.

Athenian women had limited right to property, and independently could only enter into a contract worth less than the value of a "medimnos of barley" (a measure of grain), allowing women to engage in petty trading. A woman could acquire property through gifts, dowry and inheritance, but her kyrios had the right to dispose of her property as he wished. If the head of a household died with no male heir to inherit, then a daughter could become the provisional heir of the property, known as epikleros (roughly translated to an heiress). Later, it was common for a woman to marry a close relative of her father if she became adjunct to that property.

Most upper-class Athenian boys would receive private tutelage on rhetoric and physical education, essential for political and military participation. As women participated in neither, Athenian girls received little-to-no formal education. Instead, they would apprentice with their mothers to learn the domestic arts.

The only areas in which Athenian women could participate freely were religious ritual and entertainment/prostitution. Despite the seclusion ideal, many religious festivals involved both genders. The few that did not (especially the Thesmophoria) were restricted to women alone. The priestesshood of Athena held great moral suasion and women appear to have had managed private rites of passage. Athenian practice does not appear to have clearly distinguished between entertainment and sex work, and some upper-class hetairai sex workers appear to have become some of the most independent, wealthy, and influential women in Athens.

=== In Sparta ===
The vast majority (~94%) of Spartan women were enslaved helots, a proportion extraordinary in the classical world. These women bore the economic brunt of Sparta's extractive class structure, and had few-to-no legal protections against abuse. They were raped sufficiently often to generate an entire underclass, the nothoi or mothakes. Unusually for slaves in ancient Greece, helots were free to select other helot partners for sexual reproduction, although the paramilitary krypteia would promptly kill any beautiful or unusually-capable children from such unions.

By contrast, the extremely few free ("spartiate") women enjoyed status, power, and respect that was unknown in the rest of the classical world. Spartiate women were formally excluded from military and political life, but ran estates while men were engaged in military activity. Following protracted warfare in the 4th century BC, Spartan women owned between 60% and 70% of all Spartan land and property. By the Hellenistic Period, some of the wealthiest Spartans were women.

Sparta reared young Spartiate boys for military and paramilitary work away from their family in the agoge, a practice that included extensive, violent physical and emotional abuse but likely little intellectual work. Spartiate girls instead remained with their families, learning household management and possibly becoming literate Unlike in other city-states, Spartiate women rarely performed domestic labor, which they considered demeaning and better extorted from helots. Helot-made Spartiate clothing was notoriously simple and short relative to in other polities, and scandalously bared girls' thighs.

The extent to which the state supervised Spartiate girls' education is unclear. Girls appear to have imbibed Spartan values primarily through music, dance, song, and exercise. Spartiate girls trained athletically as though for combat, and may have participated in the Gymnopaedia ("Festival of Nude Youths"). They likely ceased participation in athletic competitions after marriage, typically around age 20. Plutarch wrote in his Sayings of Spartans: "When someone inquired why they took their girls into public places unveiled, but their married women veiled, he said, 'Because the girls have to find husbands, and the married women have to keep to those who have them!'"

Spartan marriage may have been a looser relationship than in other Greek polities. Polybius writes of polygyny and wife-sharing. Spartiate men were rarely at home, and a newlywed Spartiate bride would have cross-dressed as a man to better resemble her husband's past sexual partners. Nevertheless, Sparta appears to have placed great value on bearing unflinching sons, and Spartiate women whose children died in battle appear to have been celebrated. Conversely, Plutarch writes of Spartan women killing their cowardly sons themselves.

=== In law codes and philosophical texts ===
The Gortyn code granted women a much better position than in Athens. Gortyn women, like Spartan women, were able to enter into legal agreements and appear before the court, own land and manage that property. They were able to own property without male co-ownership or permission. Husband and wife had equal right to divorce, and the wife was granted custody of the children. Sisters and brothers shared inheritances equally. Heiresses ( called epicleros, or patrouchoi in Sparta and Gortyn) had a certain freedom of choice regarding marriage. Namely, if a woman was married with children and became an epicleros, she could choose whether to divorce her husband or not. But a married woman without children who became an epicleros had no choice but to divorce and remarry, according to the regulations. In general, a daughter who inherited property could not dispose of it. An exception was that she could sell it or pledge it as payment in the amount of a debt owed to her late father's creditor.

Athens was the cradle of philosophy in Ancient Greece, and most surviving philosophic texts work to justify Athenian practice. Almost no female philosophers are known.

Plato acknowledged that extending civil and political rights to women would substantively alter the nature of the household and the state. Aristotle, who had been taught by Plato, denied that women were slaves or subject to property, arguing that "nature has distinguished between the female and the slave," but he considered wives to be "bought." He argued that women's main economic activity was that of safeguarding the household property created by men. According to Aristotle, the labour of women added no value because "the art of household management is not identical with the art of getting wealth, for the one uses the material which the other provides." Aristotle also thought Spartan women's influence and legal freedom was the cause of its ruin.

Contrary to these views, the Stoic philosophers argued for equality of the sexes, sexual inequality being in their view contrary to the laws of nature. In doing so, they followed the Cynics, who argued that men and women should wear the same clothing and receive the same kind of education. They also saw marriage as a moral companionship between equals rather than a biological or social necessity, and practiced these views in their lives. The Stoics adopted the views of the Cynics and added them to their own theories of human nature, thus putting their sexual egalitarianism on a strong philosophical basis.

=== Right to divorce ===
In the mainland of ancient Greece, marriage could be terminated by mutual consent or action taken by either spouse. However, if a woman wanted to end her marriage, she needed the help of her father or other male relative to represent her, because as a woman she was not considered a citizen of Greece. If a man wanted a divorce, all he had to do was throw his spouse out of his house. A woman's father also had the right to end the marriage. In the instance of a divorce, the dowry was returned to the woman's guardian (who was usually her father) and she had the right to retain half of the goods she had produced while in the marriage. If the couple had children, divorce resulted in full paternal custody, as children were seen as belonging to his household. While the laws regarding divorce may seem relatively fair, considering how little control women had over most aspects of their lives in ancient Greece, women were unlikely to divorce their husbands because of the damage it would do to their reputations. As women were barred from conducting legal proceedings, the kyrios would do so on their behalf.

=== In the arts ===
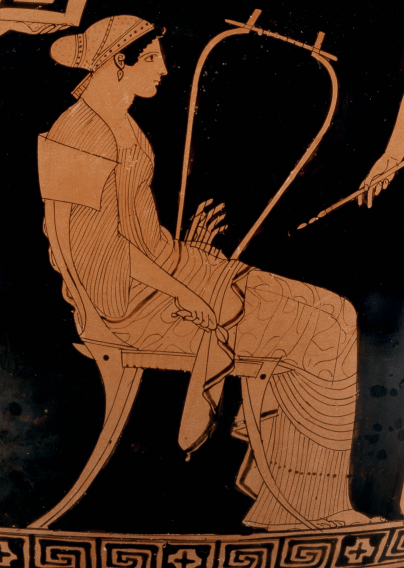
A depiction of in the women's quarters of a house, on a classical Greek vase. The photo is focused on a seated woman who is relaxed while fingering a "barbiton" (a stringed instrument).

Little surviving art depicts women in ancient Greek society. The majority of sources come from pottery displaying people's everyday lives. These artifacts often provide a window into how women were viewed, since they were generally depicted as goddesses, keepers of domestic life, or sex workers. Scenes of adornment in vase painting are a window into the women's sphere, though they are not entirely realistic, rather, a product of the voyeuristic and romanticized image of womanhood envisioned by males. Women are frequently depicted as "sexual objects" in pottery, shedding light on the sexual culture of Ancient Greece. Funeral scenes in ancient Athenian pottery depict women gesturing wildly and emotionally in response to loss, contrasted by the depiction of men, who stand orderly in restraint with a lack of emotion. According to Tim McNiven, these scenes reinforce the image of women lacking Sophrosyne (Greek virtue of self-control) in comparison to men. A majority of vase scenes portray women inside their houses. A common presence of columns suggests that women spent much of their time in the courtyard of the house — the one place where they could regularly enjoy the outdoors and get fresh air. Most Greek cooking equipment was small and light and could easily be set up there, and it can be inferred that during sunny weather, women probably sat in the roofed and shaded areas of the courtyard, for the ideal in female beauty was a pale complexion.

Lysistrata (/laɪˈsɪstrətə/ or /ˌlɪsəˈstrɑːtə/; Attic Greek: Λυσιστράτη, Lysistrátē, "Army Disbander") is an ancient Greek comedy written by Aristophanes, originally performed in classical Athens in 411 BCE. The play depicts women's extraordinary mission to end the Peloponnesian War between Greek city states by denying men sexual pleasures, which was the only thing the men desired. Lysistrata persuades the women of the warring cities to withhold sexual privileges from their husbands and lovers as a means of forcing the men to negotiate peace. This strategy, however, only inflames the battle between the sexes.

One of the few Athenians to have developed a critique and specific perspectives on the condition of women in Athens is Euripides, who presented original approaches regarding the status of women in Greece.

== Women in the Greek War of Independence ==
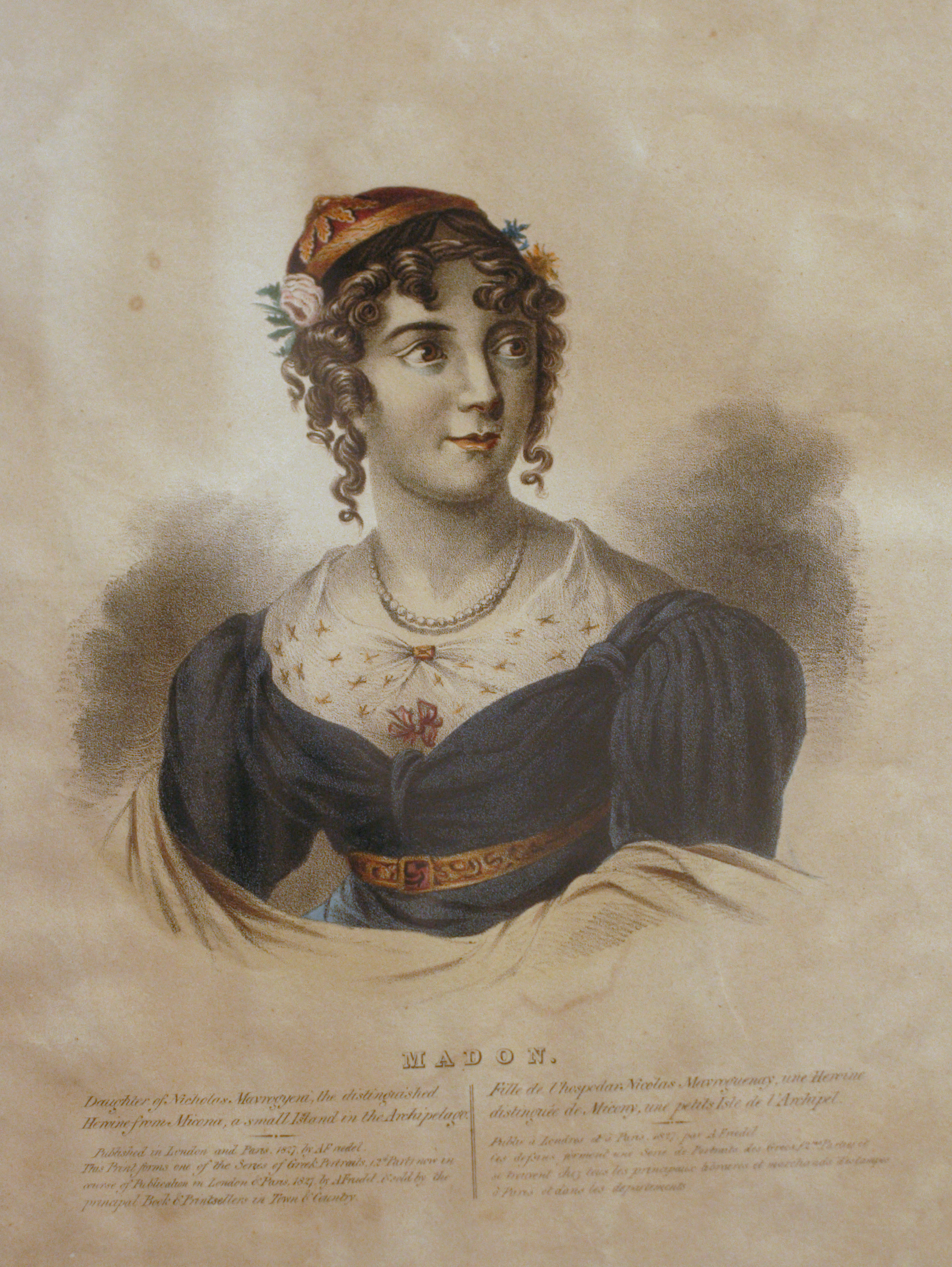
Manto Mavrogenous

Amongst the Greek warriors in the Greek War of Independence, there were also women, such as Laskarina Bouboulina. Bouboulina, also known as kapetanissa (captain/admiral) in 1821 raised on the mast of Agamemnon her own Greek flag and sailed with eight ships to Nafplion to begin a naval blockade. Later she took part also in the naval blockade and capture of Monemvasia and Pylos.

Another heroine was Manto Mavrogenous. From a rich family, she spent all her fortune for the Hellenic cause. Under her encouragement, her European friends contributed money and guns to the revolution. She moved to Nafplio in 1823, in order to be in the core of the struggle, leaving her family as she was despised even by her mother because of her choices. Soon, she became famous around Europe for her beauty and bravery.

== Contemporary period ==
During the past decades, the position of women in Greek society has changed dramatically. Efharis Petridou was the first female lawyer in Greece; in 1925 she joined the Athens Bar Association. The women of Greece won the right to vote in 1952. In 1955, women were first allowed to become judges in Greece.

In 1983, a new family law was passed which provided for gender equality in marriage. It abolished the dowry, and provided for the rights of "illegitimate" children. Adultery was also decriminalised in 1983. The new family law provided for civil marriage and liberalised the divorce law. In 2006, Greece enacted Law 3500/2006, which criminalised domestic violence, including marital rape. Law 3719/2008 further dealt with family issues, including Article 14, which reduced the separation period (necessary before a divorce in certain circumstances) from 4 years to 2 years. Greece also ratified the Council of Europe Convention on Action against Trafficking in Human Beings in 2014. As of 2014, there are 21.0% women in parliament.

Family dynamics remain conservative, however. The principal form of partnership is marriage, and extramarital childbearing and long-term cohabitation are not widespread. For instance, in 2015, Greece had the lowest percentage of births outside marriage in the European Union, at only 8.8%. Greece has a low fertility rate, at 1.33 number of children per woman (in 2015), lower than the replacement rate of 2.1.

In 2024, nationwide protests occurred throughout the country following the murder of Kyriaki Griva, who was stabbed to death by her former partner while trying to report her concerns to the police. This led to calls for femicide to become enshrined as part of Greek law, supported by some political parties like Syriza.

== See also ==
- Feminism in Greece
- Representation of women in Athenian tragedy
- Women in Classical Athens
- Women in ancient Sparta
- Phanostratê
- Women in Europe
