= Plato's Socrates =

Plato’s Socrates
- Author: Thomas C. Brickhouse and Nicholas D. Smith
- Language: English
- Subject: Ancient Greek philosophy
- Publisher: Oxford University Press
- Pages: 256
- Awards: Outstanding Academic Book for 1994 award
- ISBN: 9780195101119

Plato’s Socrates is a 1994 book by Thomas C. Brickhouse and Nicholas D. Smith in which the authors examine Socrates' depiction in Plato's works. The book won the Outstanding Academic Book for 1994 award.

== Reception ==
The book was reviewed by Catherine Zuckert and F. R. Pickering.
