= Metageitnia =

Ancient Greek festival held in Athens

Metageitnia (Ancient Greek: Μεταγείτνια, μετά + γειτονία literally change of neighborhood) was an Ancient Greek festival held in Athens during the month Metageitnion (August/September) in the honor of Metageitnius Apollo. The month of Metageitnion was named after the festival Metageitnia, which celebrated the migration of Theseus from Melite to Diomeia. The celebration of the festival itself declined over time and was replaced by the Apaturia. The festival evolved into a celebration of migrations, immigrations, departures, and colonizations among the Ionians - Metageitnius Apollo presided over the metoikia (the abode).

The Metageitnia is also mentioned by Plutarch in the treatise On Exile in Moralia.

== See also ==
- Athenian festivals
