= Pytheas (Athenian) =

Ancient Athenian orator

Pytheas (Ancient Greek: Πυθέας) of Athens was an orator who wrote speeches and other works. Pytheas opposed fellow orators Demosthenes and Demades. In 323 BC, he was a persecutor of Demosthenes in the Harpalus bribery scandal.

Following the death of Alexander the Great in 323 BC, he opposed Demosthenes, who attempted to create an anti-Macedonian front. Together with another Athenian orator, Callimedon, Pytheas fled to Athens for the camp of Antipater and later traveled through the ancient Greek world working to prevent the other Greek cities from attaching themselves to Athens.

== Character of Pytheas ==
Ancient sources convey that he was considered an insolent man by his contemporaries. For example, in his opposition to the deification of Alexander the Great, when other statesmen told him that he was not yet of an age to give advice on such matter of importance, he replied that he was older than Alexander, whom they wanted to make a god.
