= The Gridiron Club (Oxford University) =

Private members' club of the University of Oxford

The Gridiron Club, popularly called The Grid, is a dining club open to male and female students at the University of Oxford.

== History ==
The club was founded in 1884 and, as with other beefsteak clubs of the 18th and 19th centuries, the traditional grilling gridiron is the club's symbol, which appears on the club tie (white gridirons on an Oxford blue field).

Notable former members of the club include John le Carré, Alexander Thynn, 7th Marquess of Bath, Lord Michael Pratt (a former Secretary of the Grid), David Cameron (President of the Grid 1987–1988), Boris Johnson, George Osborne and Jacob Rees-Mogg.

Sports journalist Sally Jones and Lord Salisbury's daughter Lady Georgiana Campbell both gained notoriety by separately standing for election to the then all-male club (Lady Georgiana famously doing so in male clothing).

References have been made to the Gridiron Club in many works, including Evelyn Waugh's Brideshead Revisited, Compton MacKenzie's Sinister Street and Ferdinand Mount's Cold Cream: My Early Life and Other Mistakes.

== Club operation ==
The name of any prospective member is entered into 'The Book'. Current members may subsequently sign in approval of the proposed. If any current member disapproves of the proposed, they are given the opportunity to 'black ball' with proper justification. Members of other clubs, such as The Bullingdon Club, the Piers Gaveston Society and The Stoics, are usually chosen from among existing Grid members.

Day-to-day management is handled by an undergraduate committee consisting of a President, Treasurer, Secretary and a small number of other members 'without portfolio'.

The Gridiron has a board of trustees, the members of which are usually former members of the club. In addition, there is at least one Senior Member who supervises the running of the club and is invariably a don at the University of Oxford. Past Senior Members of the Grid include the distinguished historians Jeremy Catto of Oriel College and Maurice Keen of Balliol.

The Gridiron's reciprocal club at the University of Cambridge is the University Pitt Club.

== See also ==
- List of University of Oxford dining clubs
- University Pitt Club
- Vincent's Club
