= Callimedon =

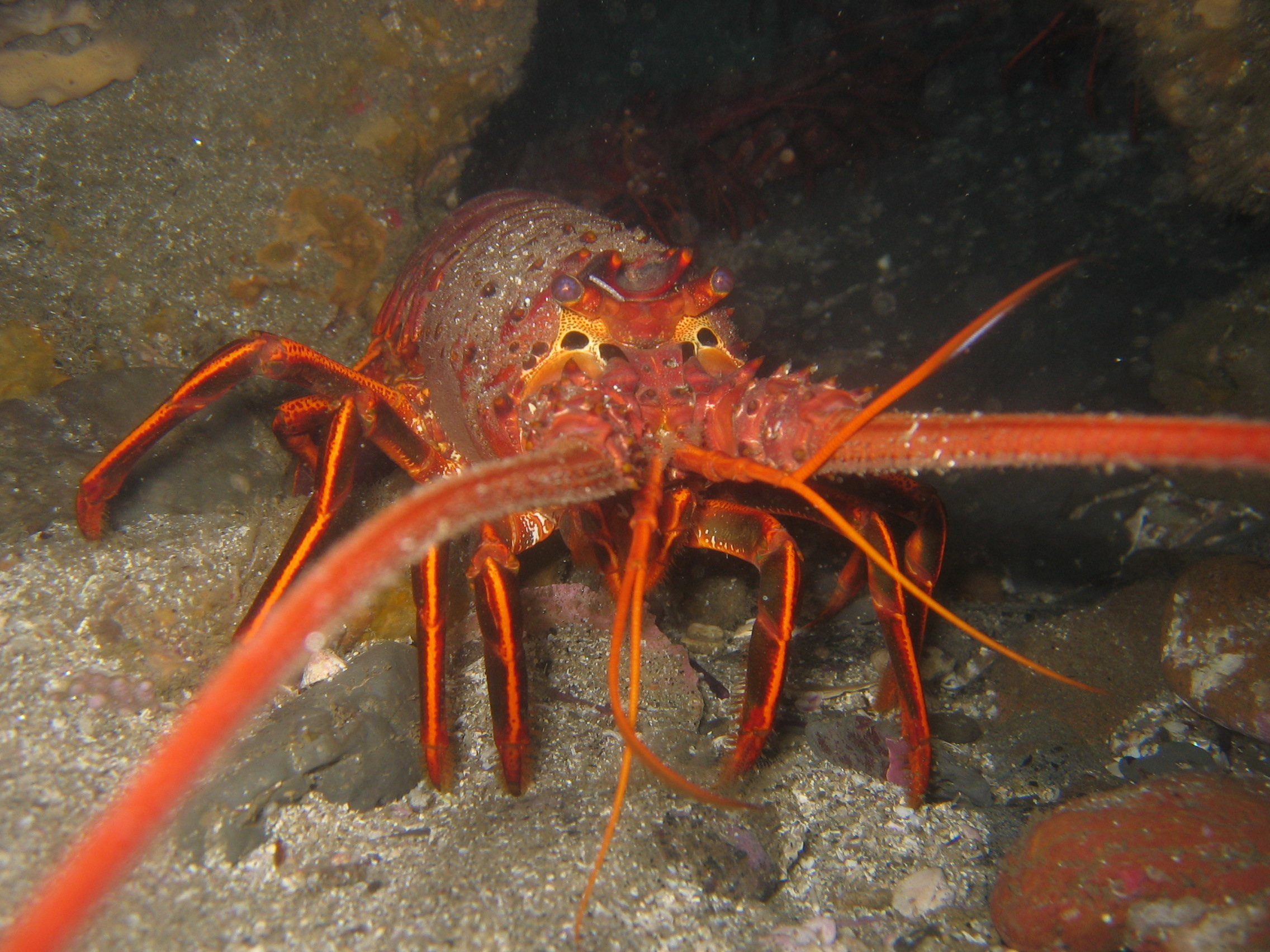
His contemporaries called Callimedon "The Spiny Lobster" because he so enjoyed to eat the crustacean.

Callimedon (Ancient Greek: Καλλιμέδων) was an orator and politician at Athens during the 4th century BCE who was a member of the pro-Macedonian faction in the city. None of his speeches survive, but details of his involvement in the controversies of his age are preserved by Dinarchus and Plutarch. He is described as brash and antidemocratic, and was surnamed ὁ Κάραβος (ho Kárabos)—"The Crayfish," "Crab" or, more likely, "Spiny Lobster"—because, according to Athenaeus, he was very fond of the food. Callimedon is best known today for the ridicule he was subjected to on the comic stage, where he was mocked for his gluttony and strabismus.

== Life and politics ==
The year of his birth is unknown, but Callimedon was probably born during the first quarter of the 4th century BCE since he is named as a contemporary of Demosthenes by Athenaeus. He has been identified with a man called "Callimedon of Collytus, son of Callicrates," on a late fourth-century Attic inscription recording the lease of a mine. Nothing further is known of this Callicrates, but Callimedon's family appears to have been an influential and aristocratic one from Collytus, an Athenian neighbourhood south of the Acropolis.

Callimedon's grandfather Agyrrhius had been a prominent (and pro-democratic) politician in the early fourth-century and was appointed strategos in 389. As a member of an elite family, Callimedon had access to the upper rungs of the Athenian social ladder and he appears to have been regarded as something of a local celebrity and raconteur. He was a member of the dining club known as "the Sixty" which met in the Heracleion at Diomeia and whose collective wit was so famous that Philip II of Macedon was said to have paid the group a talent to send him a collection of their jokes.

Dinarchus reports that Demosthenes attempted to prosecute Callimedon in 324 BCE for conspiring with Athenian exiles in Megara to replace the democracy with an oligarchy under Macedonian control.

Following the death of Alexander in 323 BCE, the democratic interests in the Greek cities once again attempted to unite against Macedon, and Callimedon together with Pytheas (Athenian) fled Athens for the camp of Antipater. Just one year later he participated in peace negotiations between Antipater and the new anti-democratic Athenian leader Phocion, where he advised Antipater to follow through with harsh demands on the Athenians.

He had to flee Athens again after the unraveling of the pro-Antipatrid leadership of Phocion. In 318 BCE he was tried in absentia and condemned to death by the democratic leaning leadership of Athens.

== Bibliography ==
- Bayliss, A.J. (2011), After Demosthenes: The Politics of Early Hellenistic Athens, London, ISBN 978-1-4411-1151-7.
- Bradeen, D.W. (1974), The Athenian Agora, Volume XVII. Inscriptions: The Funerary Monuments, Princeton.
- Hunter, R.L. (1983), Eubulus: The Fragments, Cambridge, ISBN 978-0-521-24436-7.
- Kirchner, J. (1901), Prosopographia Attica, vol. i, Berlin.
- Thompson, D.W. (1957), A Glossary of Greek Fishes, London.
- Webster, T.B.L. (1953), Studies in Later Greek Comedy, Manchester.
