= Melite (heroine) =

In Greek mythology, Melite (/ˈmɛlɪtiː/; Ancient Greek: Μελίτη), daughter of Apollo, or alternatively Myrmex, was the eponym of the deme Melite in Attica. According to a scholiast on Aristophanes, Melite was a lover of Heracles who was initiated into the lesser mysteries during his stay in Attica; there was a temple of Heracles the Protector from Evil (Alexikakos) in the deme Melite. Heracles and Melite have been recognized in the figures portrayed alongside Demeter on the right half of the west pediment of the Parthenon.

Melite was also said to have been a companion of Poseidon.
