= Pythic Club =

Collegiate dining club at Oxford University

The Pythic (or "P") Club was a private students' dining club at Oxford University, formerly based in Christ Church. The club was historically associated with Christ Church and it selected its members from the college pool. It is no longer an official college society.

Membership was open by invitation to both "students" (i.e. fellows of the college) and undergraduates. It was principally a cultural discussion-based dining club.

The college archivist holds materials relating to the club dating back to 1845.

== History ==
The club was initially set up in 1845 as an essay society by Lord Dufferin, a British colonialist and administrator. Yet by the 1930s, it had become an invite-only dining society, with notable members including the historian and Conservative peer Hugh Trevor-Roper.

More recently, the club had been characterised as an exclusive club for "posh students" with dinners believed to start at £90. The dinners also involved select fellows and tutors of the college, who were widely believed to enforce the secrecy and exclusivity of the club.

The club came into the spotlight after the Oxford Student revealed it was being run by the Christ Church's then Senior Censor, Brian Young. The Club received intense criticism from Christ Church JCR members and was eventually banned from meeting on college grounds.

== Criticisms ==
As the existence of the club became more widely known, students began to criticise the nature of the club. The main criticisms were as follows:

- Membership of the club was restricted to wealthier students and was predominantly made up of the privately educated, contravening equality and diversity rules
- The club undermined the college's access efforts by "sustaining discrimination based on social class [and] neurotypicality"
- The club perpetuated the "classist" and "elitist" fallacy of intelligence being linked to the ability to conduct oneself in dinner conversation, something "inextricably linked to cultural capital"
- The club undermined the relationships between students with tutor-members, who could be unsure of fair treatment in tutorials and teaching, leading to feelings of inferiority and self-consciousness

== Relationship with the College ==
Following rumours the Club was attempting to register, and therefore formalise its activities under official college auspices, the JCR Committee of the college voted to condemn the club. An Open Letter was then circulated to students, calling for the club to be refused registration if it failed to abandon "all aspects of secrecy, selectivity, and exclusivity". The letter attracted around 100 signatures before being taken down for unknown reasons. The club subsequently failed to register and was thus banned from meeting in Christ Church. In response to the outcome, Christ Church stated that “Registration requires clubs and societies to abide by all college regulations and policies, including those related to equality and diversity.”
