= Myrmidon Club =

Dining club at Merton College, University of Oxford

The Myrmidon Club is a dining club elected from the members of Merton College, Oxford, and with a continuous history exceeding 150 years. Until recently, the club was single-sex, and an equivalent club for women, named the Myrmaids, was established following the college's decision to admit women students in 1980. It is now a mixed-gender society.

== History ==
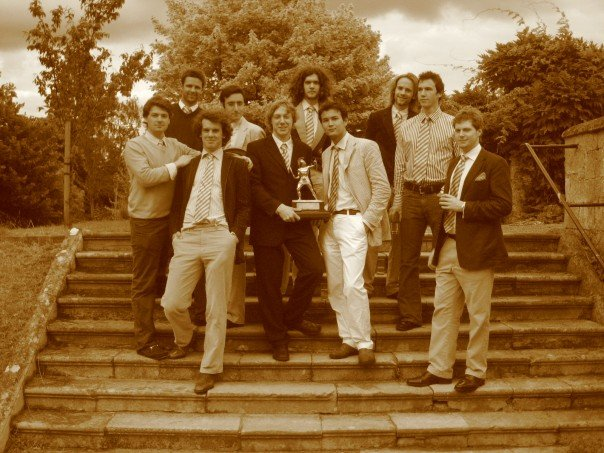
The Myrmidon Club in 2007

Founded in 1865, it is one of the handful of such clubs with an almost continuous existence from the second half of the 19th century. In the earlier years of its existence it had its own rooms off the High.

Describing Lord Randolph Churchill's membership of the Club towards the end of the 1860s, T.H.S. Escott wrote:

"There is a certain monotony in the chronicle of the doings at these feasts. In all cases there are the same narratives of proctors' invasions, youthful concealments in coal-cellars, varied sometimes by the incarceration of indiscreet waiters in pantries or ice safes; or encounters with proctors and bull-dogs, tempered by conflicts with the city police."

L. E. Jones in his memoir described a dinner which (as a member of Balliol) he attended as a guest in his first term. He drank 24 glasses of port, was rescued from the shrubbery and was carried to bed by his friends:

"The miseries of that spinning night and of the next day have preserved me for life from drunkenness ... Not even the killing of Hector by the Myrmidons, in Shakespeare's version of that tragedy, could have been, since it was swifter, so brutal a handling as I got from the Myrmidons of Merton. Yet, manners being manners, I wrote a note to say how much I had enjoyed myself."

== Traditions ==
The club takes its name from the legendary warriors commanded by Achilles, as described in Homer's Iliad.

The Club has storage facilities in College, but in common with similar college dining societies is intermittently out of favour with the college authorities.

Its colours are purple, gold and silver. Members wear ties with stripes of these colours.

== Popular references ==
The Club is thought to be the model for the Junta, the fictional club in Max Beerbohm's Zuleika Dobson, of which the Duke of Dorset was for some time the sole member. Beerbohm was himself Honorary Secretary of the Myrmidons.

== Notable members ==
- Max Beerbohm
- Lennox Berkeley
- George Binney
- Brigadier Lorne Campbell VC
- Lord Randolph Churchill
- Sir George Clutton, HM Ambassador to Poland
- John Edward Bernard Hill, MP for South Norfolk
- Andrew Irvine
- Sir Harold Kent, HM Procurator General and Treasury Solicitor
- Sir George Mallaby
- Reginald Maudling
- Airey Neave
- Anthony Nuttall
- Colin Sleeman, war crimes defence counsel and judge
- Reginald Turner
- Edward Vaizey
- Angus Wilson

== See also ==
- List of University of Oxford dining clubs
