= Melite (Attica) =

Coordinates: 37°58′30″N 23°43′08″E

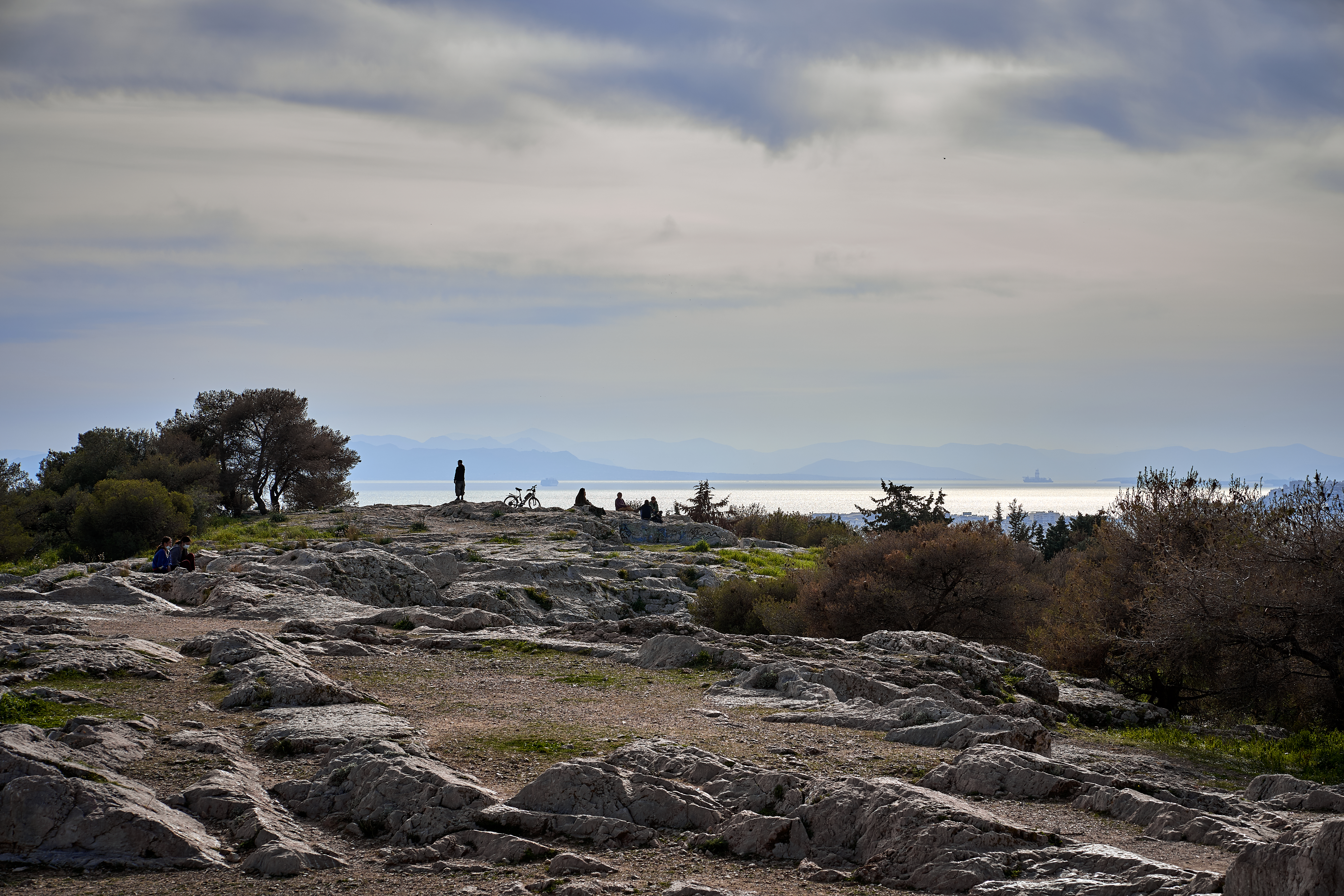
The Melite plateau

Melite (Ancient Greek: Μελίτη) was a deme of ancient Attica, located in the city centre of Athens, within the walls erected by Themistocles and to the west of the Acropolis. It included the Agora and the Pnyx. It belonged to the tribe of Kekropis.

== Etymology ==
The name of the deme derives from Melite, daughter of Myrmex. It was said that she had initiated Heracles into the Eleusinian Mysteries, and some sources portray her as the mother of Heracles' son, Hyllus. In the 19th and 20th centuries, it was believed that the name had a Phoenician influence, in fact it is homophone of the ancient names of the island of Malta and of Samothrace; today, however, it is believed that the toponym derives from the word "honey" (Ancient Greek: μέλι, romanized: méli).

== Description ==
Besides the Pnyx and the public buildings of the agora, in Melite there was also the Temple of Hephaestus. There was also a sanctuary of Heracles, with a statue by Phidias or his teacher Ageladas erected to commemorate the end of an epidemic in 429 BCE.

Eurysaces, son of Ajax the Great, was the owner of a sanctuary in which he was venerated along with his father. It was said that he migrated with his brother to Athens and granted the Athenians the island of Salamis in exchange for citizenship; this myth was probably current in the 6th century BCE to justify the Athenian conquest of Salamis. Many of Eurysaces' descendants became prominent aristocrats and priests, including Alcibiades.

In the deme, there was also a temple of Theseus, which it was said contained his grave. Tradition said that the original inhabitants of the deme emigrated to Diomea, where they brought with them the cult of Heracles.

Melite was a very populous place: among the non-native inhabitants of here, there were Epicurus, who left his home to the successive heads of his school; Callias II; Phocion; Themistocles, who had a temple to Artemis built near his house.
