= Phaenarete =

Mother of Socrates

Phaenarete (Greek Φαιναρέτη, born c. 484 BC), wife of Sophroniscus, was the mother of the Greek philosopher Socrates and his half-brother, Patrocles. (Since Sophroniscus had died before 424 BC, he was probably Phaenarete's first husband, while Chaeredemus, father of Patrocles, was her second.) Historian of philosophy Debra Nails puts Phaenarete's birthdate around 484 BC, as she must have been old enough to give birth to Socrates in 469 and yet young enough to give birth to Patrocles about 450. She was apparently alive at the time of the Euthydemus, which was set in or after 407.

The name Phaenarete means "She who brings virtue to light", and it is, according to A.E. Taylor, "suggestive of good family connexions", based on its appearance in the genealogy of the immortal Amphitheus in Aristophanes' Acharnians.

Very little is known of the life of Phaenarete. In Plato's Theaetetus, Socrates compares his own work as a philosopher with hers as a maia (midwife). According to John Burnet, the role of maia was "performed by women of good family".
