= Diomea (Attica) =

Coordinates: 37°58′03″N 23°44′04″E

Diomea or Diomeia (Ancient Greek: Διόμεια) was a deme of ancient Attica, located in the city of Athens, both within and outside the walls of Themistocles, in interior portion included the eastern sector of the city, and the external portion contained the Cynosarges. It was located south of the Ilisus, between Alopece to the south and Ancyle to the east. A gate of Athens was called the Diomean Gate. Originally in the phyle Aigeis, it was later in the phyle Demetrias.

== Description ==
According to the legend the deme was founded by some citizens of Collytus and Melite, whose head was Diomus, worshiper and perhaps lover of Heracles. The first killing of a bull and the consummation of the sacred grain is attributed to Diomus. After the death of the demigod, Diomus offered him a sacrifice but a white dog disturbed the event, stealing the sacrificial meats and leaving them far away. At that point Diomus decided to found the Cynosarges sanctuary. Every five years a famous feast in honor of Heracles was held in Diomea. This shrine was associated with a gymnasium in which the illegitimate youth or those with only one Athenian citizen parent studied. The cynical school founded by Antisthenes also gathered here at the beginning of 4th century BCE. At the Heracleion, Callimedon's dinner club of "the Sixty" met.

The deme, whose external part developed outside the walls of Athens, was not of a large extent, being bordered by Alopece which was 11 or 12 stadia from the city .

The inhabitants of Diomea were known as arrogant and rude, so that Aristophanes, for them, coined a new word, translatable with "Diomean arrogance."

== People ==
- Callimedon (fl. 4th century BCE), orator and politician
- Stratocles (fl. 4th-3rd centuries BCE), politician and writer
