= USS Myrmidon =

US Navy tank landing ship

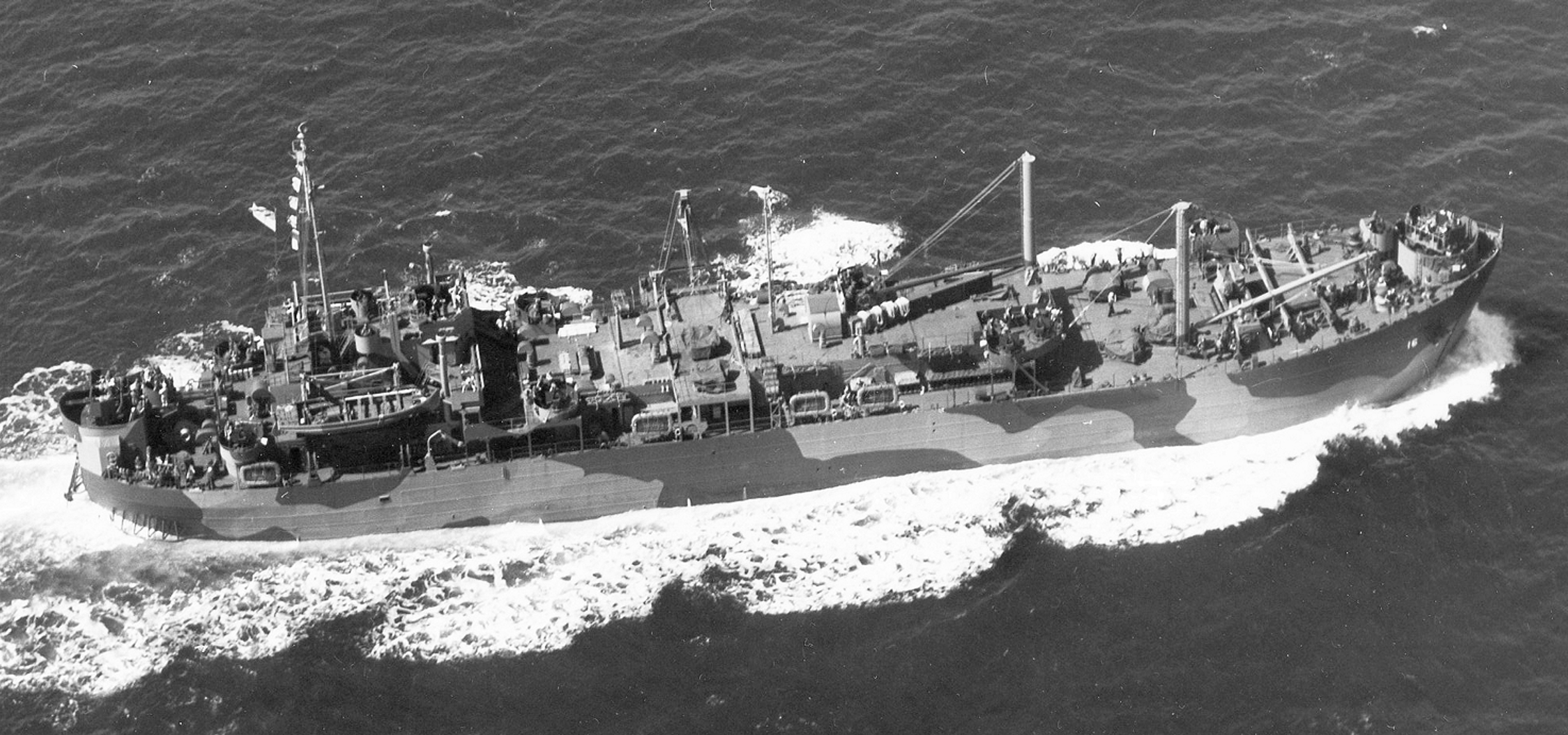
- USS Myrmidon (ARL-16) ex-USS LST-948

History

United States
- Name: LST-948; Myrmidon
- Namesake: Myrmidons
- Builder: Bethlehem Hingham Shipyard, Hingham, Massachusetts
- Yard number: 3419
- Laid down: 25 August 1944
- Launched: 28 September 1944
- Commissioned: 19 October 1944, partial commission; 9 March 1945, full commission
- Decommissioned: 10 November 1944; 7 July 1947
- Renamed: 11 September 1944
- Stricken: 1 April 1960
- Identification: Hull symbol: LST-948; Hull symbol: ARL-16; Code letters: NVUY
- Fate: Sold, 21 December 1960

General characteristics
- Class & type: LST-542-class tank landing ship; Achelous-class repair ship
- Displacement: 3,900 long tons (4,000 t) light; 4,100 long tons (4,200 t) full load
- Length: 328 ft (100 m) oa
- Beam: 50 ft (15 m)
- Draft: 11 ft 2 in (3.40 m)
- Installed power: 2 × 900 hp (670 kW) Electro-Motive Diesel 12-567A diesel engines; 1,800 shp (1,300 kW)
- Propulsion: 1 × Falk main reduction gears; 2 × Propellers
- Speed: 11.6 kn (21.5 km/h; 13.3 mph)
- Complement: 22 officers, 233 enlisted men
- Armament: 2 × quad 40 mm (1.57 in) Bofors guns (with Mark 51 director); 2 × twin 40 mm Bofors guns (with Mark 51 director); 6 × twin 20 mm (0.79 in) Oerlikon cannons

USS Myrmidon (ARL-16) was laid down as a United States Navy LST-542-class tank landing ship but converted to one of 39 Achelous-class repair ships that were used for repairing landing craft during World War II. Named for the Myrmidons (in Greek mythology, warriors of the fierce Thessalian tribe who accompanied King Achilles, their leader, to the Trojan War), she was the only US Naval vessel to bear the name.

== Construction ==
Laid down as LST-948 on 25 August 1944, at Hingham, Massachusetts, by the Bethlehem Hingham Shipyard; named Myrmidon 11 September 1944; launched 28 September 1944; sponsored by Mrs. Marguerite Ross; placed in reduced commission 19 October 1944; transferred to Jacksonville, Florida; decommissioned there 10 November 1944; converted to ARL-16 by Merrill Stevens Shipyard, Jacksonville; and commissioned 9 March 1945.

== Service history ==
After shakedown along the east coast, Myrmidon departed Norfolk, Virginia, for the Pacific on 10 April. She reached San Diego, late in the month; then, after loading cargo at San Francisco, she steamed to Pearl Harbor, on 19 May, for duty with Amphibious Force, Pacific Fleet. Sailing in convoy 30 May, she steamed via the Marshall Islands to Iwo Jima, where she arrived 22 June.

During the closing weeks of fighting in the Pacific Myrmidon operated at Iwo Jima, repairing, disbursing, and provisioning ships at that important American forward base. Following the Japanese surrender, she continued service and repair duties throughout the Pacific from the Marianas to Pearl Harbor.

Late in 1946 she returned to the Gulf coast and was placed in a reduced service status in January 1947. She decommissioned at Orange, Texas, 7 July 1947, and entered the Atlantic Reserve Fleet. She remained berthed with ships of the Orange Group for more than a decade. Her name was struck from the Naval Vessel Register 1 April 1960, and she was sold 21 December 1960, to River Equipment, Inc., of Memphis, Tennessee, and later resold to the Dravo Corporation, Neville Island, Pittsburgh, Pennsylvania, 16 January 1961. Resold to the Avondale Shipbuilding Corporation c. 1962, her final fate is unknown.

== Bibliography ==
Online resources

- "Myrmidon". Dictionary of American Naval Fighting Ships. Naval History and Heritage Command. 12 August 2015. This article incorporates text from this source, which is in the public domain.
- "Bethlehem-Hingham, Hingham MA". ShipbuildingHistory.com. 11 August 2011.
- "USS Myrmidon (ARL-16)". NavSource. 13 December 2013.
