= Myrmidons =

Mythological soldiers commanded by Achilles in Homer's Iliad

In Greek mythology, the Myrmidons or Myrmidones (Ancient Greek: Μυρμῐδόνες, romanized: Murmidónes, singular: Μυρμῐδών, Murmidṓn) were an ancient Thessalian tribe. In Homer's Iliad, the Myrmidons are the Achaean soldiers commanded by Achilles.

Their eponymous ancestor was Myrmidon, a king of Phthia, who was a son of Zeus and "wide-ruling" Eurymedousa, a princess of Phthiotis. In one account, Zeus seduced Eurymedousa in the form of an ant. An etiological myth of their origins, simply expanding upon their supposed etymology—the name in Classical Greek was interpreted as "ant-people", from myrmedon (Ancient Greek: μῠρμηδών, murmēdṓn, plural: μῠρμηδόνες, murmēdónes), which means "ant-nest"—was first mentioned by Ovid in the Metamorphoses. In Ovid's telling, the Myrmidons were simple worker-ants on the island of Aegina.

== Mythology ==
Hera, queen of the gods, sent a plague to kill all the human inhabitants of Aegina because the island was named for one of the lovers of Zeus. King Aeacus, a son of Zeus and the intended target of Hera along with his mother, prayed to his father for a means to repopulate the island.

As the myrmekes (Ancient Greek: μύρμηκες, múrmēkes, singular: μύρμηξ, múrmēx), the ants of the island, were unaffected by the sickness, Zeus responded by transforming them into a race of men, the Myrmidons. They were as fierce and hardy as ants, and intensely loyal to their leader.

After a time, Aeacus exiled his two sons, Peleus and Telamon, for murdering their half-brother, Phocus. Peleus went to Phthia and a group of Myrmidons followed him to Thessaly. Peleus's son, Achilles, brought them to Troy to fight in the Trojan War. They feature as the loyal followers of Achilles in most accounts of the Trojan War.

Another tradition states that the Myrmidons had no such remarkable beginnings, but were merely the descendants of Myrmidon, a Thessalian nobleman, who married Peisidice, the daughter of Aeolus, king of Thessaly. Myrmidon was the father of Actor and Antiphus. As king of Phthia, Actor (or his son) invited Peleus to stay in Thessaly.

According to Stephanus of Byzantium, Aegina was referred to as Myrmidonia (Μυρμιδονία), the "land of the Myrmidons", though the name is otherwise unattested.

John Tzetzes reports three different versions of the origin of the Myrmidons. In the first version, when Aegina gave birth to Aeacus, he was alone on the island and unhappy. Because of this, he prayed to Zeus to change the ants on the island into men, and this happened. In the second version, Peleus had fled after murdering his brother Phocus. At this time, Aeacus, their father, prayed and the ants were transformed into men, who were then called Myrmidons. In the third version, it is said that after Peleus killed his brother and fled to Thessaly, where he had no army, he prayed to Zeus. In response, the ants were transformed into men, and they were called Myrmidons.

The Molossian ruling dynasty claimed to be descended from mythological Molossus, one of the three sons of Neoptolemus, son of Achilles and Deidamia. Following the sack of Troy, Neoptolemus and his armies settled in Epirus where they joined with the local population. Molossus inherited the kingdom of Epirus after the death of Helenus, son of Priam and Hecuba of Troy, who had married his erstwhile sister-in-law Andromache after Neoptolemus's death.

According to the ancient tradition the city of Byllis in Illyria was founded by the Myrmidons led by Neoptolemus, the son of Achilles.

== Medieval use of the name ==
Achilles was described by Leo the Deacon (born ca. 950) not as Hellene, but as Scythian, while according to the Byzantine author John Malalas (c. 491–578), his army was made up of a tribe previously known as Myrmidons and "known now as Bulgars". The 12th-century Byzantine poet John Tzetzes also identified the Myrmidons with the Bulgars, whom he also identified with the Paeonians, although the latter may be intended in a purely geographical sense. In the 11th century, Michael Attaleiates called the Rus' Myrmidons, but this usage did not catch on.

According to Byzantine history scholar Andrew J. Ekonomou, these represent intentional distortions designed to "minimize the valor of pagan heroes, and eventually to extinguish their memory altogether". Anthony Kaldellis, on the other hand, argues that such use of classical ethnonyms for modern peoples "do[es] not really fall under the category of distortion at all".

== Modern usage ==
The Myrmidons of Greek myth were known for their loyalty to their leaders, so that in pre-industrial Europe the word "myrmidon" carried many of the same connotations that "robot" does today, particularly the unquestioning nature of its following direction. "Myrmidon" later came to mean "hired ruffian", according to the Oxford English Dictionary.

- Henry Fielding in Tom Jones (1749, Book XV, ch. 5) employs the term in the sense of "hired thugs": "The door flew open, and in came Squire Western, with his parson and a set of myrmidons at his heels."
- The Royal Navy has had several ships called HMS Myrmidon.
- The United States Navy has had one vessel named USS Myrmidon (ARL-16).
- "The Myrmidons" was the name adopted in 1865 by a private dining society in Merton College, Oxford, which continues in existence. Max Beerbohm was a member (and Hon. Secretary), and the club called "The Junta" that features in his Oxford novel Zuleika Dobson is probably modelled on the Myrmidons. Other former members include Lord Randolph Churchill and Andrew Irvine.

== See also ==
- Myrmex, woman who became an ant
- Mycenaean Greece
- Bronze Age
