= Thomas C. Brickhouse =

American philosopher (born 1947)

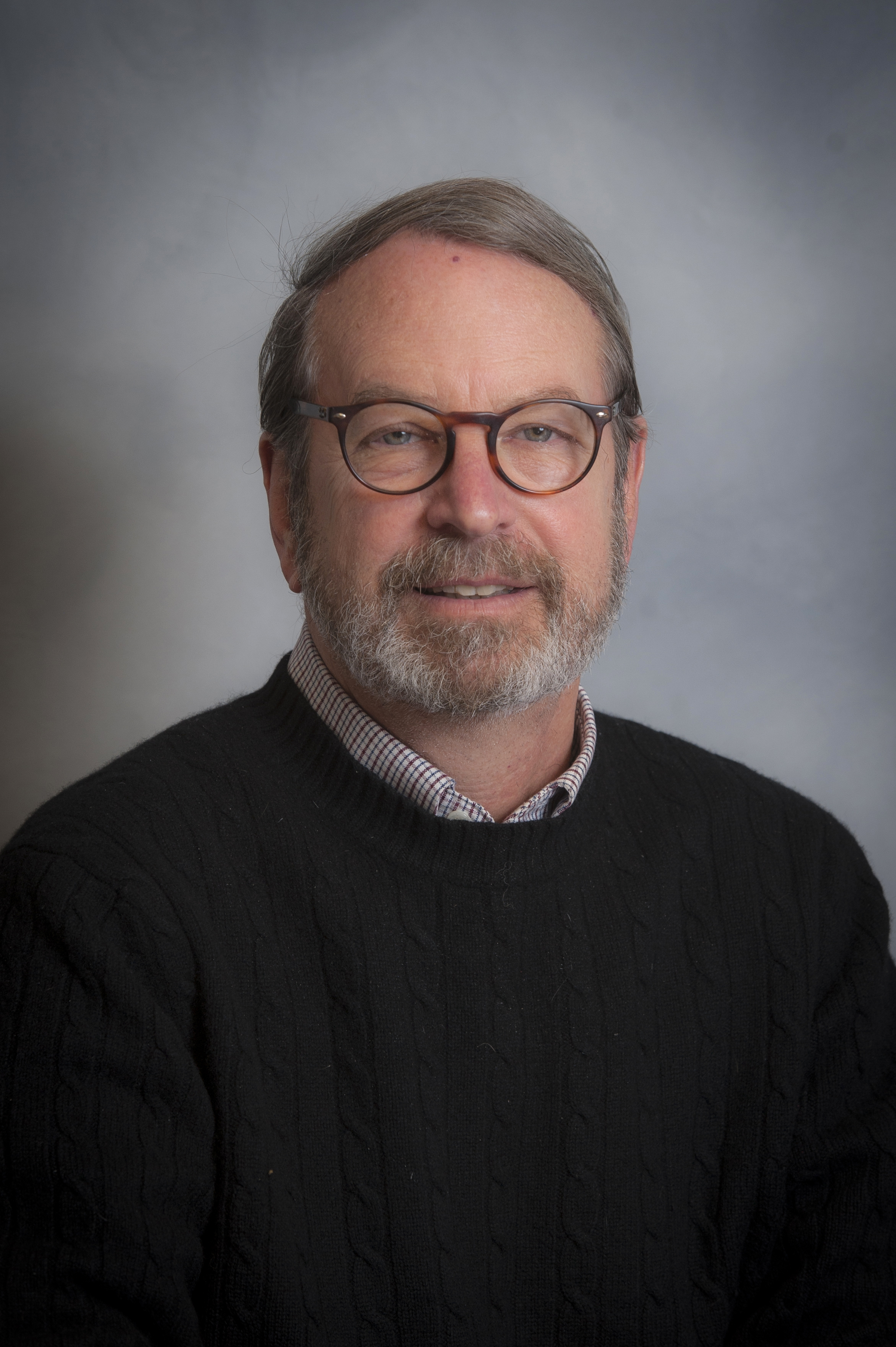
- Born: 1947 (age 78–79)

Education
- Education: Vanderbilt University (PhD)

Philosophical work
- Era: 21st-century philosophy
- Region: Western philosophy
- School: Ancient philosophy
- Institutions: University of Lynchburg
- Main interests: Ancient Greek philosophy

Thomas C. Brickhouse (born 1947) is an American philosopher and John Turner Professor of the Humanities and Professor of Philosophy, Emeritus at the University of Lynchburg. He won the Outstanding Academic Book for 1994 award for his book Plato’s Socrates (with Nicholas D. Smith). Brickhouse is known for his research on Ancient Greek philosophy.

== Books ==
- Socratic Moral Psychology (with Nicholas D. Smith; Cambridge University Press, 2010, 276 pp.)
- Routledge Philosophy GuideBook to Plato and the Trial of Socrates (with Nicholas D. Smith, Routledge 2004, 297 pp.)
- The Trial and Execution of Socrates: Sources and Controversies (ed. and trans. with Nicholas D. Smith, Oxford University Press, 2002), 286 pp.
- The Philosophy of Socrates (with Nicholas D. Smith, Westview Press, History of Philosophy series, 2000, 290 pp.)
- Plato's Socrates (with Nicholas D. Smith, Oxford University Press, 1994, 240 pp.)
- Socrates on Trial (with Nicholas D. Smith, Oxford University Press and Princeton University Press, 1989, 316 pp.; trans. into Japanese by T. Mishima and S. Yonezawa, Tokai University Press, 1994, 508 pp.)
