= Murder of Kyriaki Griva =

2024 murder in Athens

- Location: Agioi Anargyroi, Athens, Greece
- Date: 1 April 2024; 2 years ago
- Attack type: Murder
- Victim: Kyriaki Griva
- Perpetrator: Thanasis Kourelis
- Motive: Domestic abuse
- Convictions: Murder

Kyriaki Griva (Greek: Κυριακή Γρίβα; died 1 April 2024) was a Greek woman who was stabbed to death by her former partner outside of a police station in Athens where she had been declined support from duty officers. Her murder sparked protests across Greece calling for legal reforms to recognise femicide, in addition to the police's handling of domestic abuse cases. She was recorded the fifth woman to be killed by an ex or current partner in Greece in 2024.

== Personal life ==
Griva was the daughter of Thanasis Grivas and Despina Kalea and lived in northern Athens. She had been in an on and off relationship with Thanasis Kourelis, who was ten years her senior. They had previously separated in 2020 and Griva had subsequently accused him of rape, resulting in a restraining order being granted. Griva did not pursue the rape charge and police did not progress the matter, despite Greek law making it possible to prosecute rape cases ex officio even without the victim's involvement.

== Murder ==
On 1 April 2024, Griva had met with a friend at a café and noticed Kourelis in the vicinity. She was subsequently accompanied with her friend to visit a local police station in Agioi Anargyroi. Griva reported that Kourelis had been loitering outside of her home; while she declined to make a formal complaint, she requested that a police vehicle transport her home for her own safety. Griva was asked by a duty police officer to contact the police emergency line; some press reports stated that she had been told by the officer that there were no vehicles to transport her despite a car and driver being present at the station at the time. Griva walked outside of the station and made a telephone call to the emergency line, where it was alleged that the operator told her "lady, police cars are not taxis". While the operator was taking details from Griva, Kourelis approached her and stabbed her five times in the back. Griva died before paramedics arrived on the scene.

=== Aftermath ===
Kourelis stabbed himself at the scene and was arrested by police officers before being taken to hospital for treatment. It was subsequently reported that he had been admitted onto a psychiatric ward. Griva's family reported they learned of her murder on social media and after journalists made contact with them asking for comment.

In the days following the murder, following considerable public outcry, the Hellenic Police partially defended the actions of the officers at Agioi Anargyroi station, stating that the order to deploy a police car could only be made by an officer within the Emergency Response Centre. Local press reported that had officers completed checks on Kourelis as Griva made her report, it would have highlighted that in 2020 reports had been filed against him for violence against police officers as well as drug offences. Within days, an update was made to the 2022 incident management guide that aimed at providing high levels of police support to women seeking help for domestic abuse.

Michalis Chrisochoidis, the Minister of Citizen Protection, promised a "full, in-depth" investigation into Griva's death, and publicly supported calls for adding the term "femicide" to the Greek penal code. The Prime Minister of Greece, Kyriakos Mitsotakis, publicly supported Chrisochoidis, stating the murder was not his fault and that he was trying to change problems "that had been perpetuated for a very long time". The President of Greece, Katerina Sakellaropoulou, expressed "shock" at the murder, stating it "shakes and angers us", calling on authorities to urgently fight gender-based violence and crime.

In the Hellenic Parliament, the New Left and Syriza introduced legislation that would legally recognise femicide as a crime.

== Criminal investigations ==
Kourelis was charged with intentional homicide in a calm state of mind; illegally carrying and using weapons; and supplying and possessing drugs. His trial started in June 2025 at Evelpidon Court in Athens. Griva's father described Kourelis' relationship with Griva as being "coercive and exploitative". The prosecution challenged a comment made by the judge querying why Griva "loved [Kourelis] so much" if he was abusive. Kourelis' defence team argued that he had diminished responsibility due to having a history of mental illness, including psychotic depression and suicidal behaviour, and argued that he lacked awareness of his actions during the crime.

According to the family's lawyer Mazaraki, the police officers failed to properly assess the risk as they were supposed to. In his words, “there is a terrible lack of adequate training; there is also indifference."

Protests have occurred outside the court room, with some criticism of Kourelis being charged with homicide, which was felt by women's rights groups to ignore the gendered aspect of the crime and reflective of the Greek legal system's erasure of the gender dynamics that underpin crimes such as murder.

On 29 July 2025, Kourelis was sentenced to life imprisonment for Griva's murder, plus an addition five years. He was also fined 1000 EUR.

In January 2025, the Athens First Instance Prosecutor initiated criminal proceedings against four police officers in connection to Griva's murder for the crime of "fatal exposure by omission". A deputy commander was placed on four months' mandatory leave; a duty police officer and security guard on three months' leave; and an immediate response officer was fined €450. Griva's family described the sanctions as "ridiculous punishments". The family's lawyer, Eleni Mazaraki, stated that the police had a lack of adequate training concerning domestic abuse, in addition to a general indifference to gender based violence. In November 2025, the trial started of the duty police officer whom Griva had support from immediately prior to her murder. The defendant gave their deposition on 14 November, following which they were released with restrictive conditions. The officer is facing charges of fatal exposure. In addition to the duty officer, the duty supervisor and a call handler are also facing criminal charges.

In September 2026, Kourelis' appeal against his conviction began at the Mixed Jury Court of Appeal.

== Recognition ==
On the first anniversary of Griva's death on 1 April 2025, a monument was unveiled in her memory outside Agioi Anargyroi police station by Agioi Anargyroi Kamatero Municipal Council.
