= HMS Myrmidon =

Seven ships of the British Royal Navy have been named HMS Myrmidon after the Myrmidons of Greek mythology.

- The first HMS Myrmidon (1781) was a 22-gun sixth rate in use from 1781 to 1811.
- The second HMS Myrmidon (1813) was a 20-gun sixth rate launched 1813 and broken up 1823.
- The third HMS Myrmidon (1845) was an iron-hulled paddle gun vessel in service from 1845 to 1858.
- The fourth HMS Myrmidon (1867) was a wooden-hulled screw gun vessel, launched in June 1867 but completed in October as a survey vessel, and sold in 1889.
- The fifth HMS Myrmidon (1900) was a destroyer launched in 1900 and lost in a collision with a passenger ship in 1917.
- The sixth HMS Myrmidon (G90) was a destroyer launched in 1942 and loaned to the Polish Navy in that year, and as ORP Orkan (G90) sunk in 1943 by U-378.
- The seventh HMS Myrmidon (1944) was a minesweeper launched in 1944 and broken up 1958.
