= Myrmex (mythology) =

Greek mythological figures

Myrmex (Ancient Greek: Μύρμηξ, romanized: Múrmēx, lit. 'ant') may refer to the following figures in Greek mythology:

- Myrmex, father of Ephyra, eponym of Ephyra (i.e. Corinth) and wife of Epimetheus.
- Myrmex, an Attic maiden who was beloved by Athena for her chastity and intelligence. When the goddess had invented the plough, the girl boastfully pretended to have made the discovery herself, whereupon she was metamorphosed into an ant.
- Myrmex, according to Philochorus, was the father of Melite, from whom the Attic demos of Melite derived its name.
- Myrmex, that is, an ant, from which animal, according to some traditions, the Myrmidones in Thessaly derived their name. Zeus made his son Aeacus king of Thessaly, usually the island of Aegina, which was not inhabited by human beings. After a great famine had occurred, the king lost his allies and could not protect himself on the account of the scarcity of men. Aeacus while gazing at some ants begged his father to give him men for defense. Then, the god in answer of the prayer, metamorphosed all the ants of the country into men, who were thence called Myrmidones, because in Greek, ants are called múrmēkes (μύρμηκες). In the account of Strabo, these people received their name because they excavated the earth after the manner of ants and spread the soil over the rocks, so as to have ground to till, and also because they lived in the dugouts, refraining from the use of soil for bricks

== Bibliography ==
- Gaius Julius Hyginus, Fabulae from The Myths of Hyginus translated and edited by Mary Grant. University of Kansas Publications in Humanistic Studies. Online version at the Topos Text Project.
- Maurus Servius Honoratus, In Vergilii carmina comentarii. Servii Grammatici qui feruntur in Vergilii carmina commentarii; recensuerunt Georgius Thilo et Hermannus Hagen. Georgius Thilo. Leipzig. B. G. Teubner. 1881. Online version at the Perseus Digital Library.
- Strabo, The Geography of Strabo. Edition by H.L. Jones. Cambridge, Mass.: Harvard University Press; London: William Heinemann, Ltd. 1924. Online version at the Perseus Digital Library.
- Strabo, Geographica edited by A. Meineke. Leipzig: Teubner. 1877. Greek text available at the Perseus Digital Library.
