= Nicholas D. Smith =

American philosopher (born 1949)

- Born: 1949 (age 76–77)
- Awards: Outstanding Academic Book for 1994, American Philological Association Award for Excellence in the Teaching of Classics

Education
- Education: Stanford University (PhD)

Philosophical work
- Era: 21st-century philosophy
- Region: Western philosophy
- School: Ancient philosophy
- Institutions: Lewis & Clark College
- Main interests: Ancient Greek philosophy

Nicholas D. Smith (born 1949) is an American philosopher and James F. Miller Professor Emeritus of Humanities and Professor of Philosophy at Lewis & Clark College. He won the “Outstanding Academic Book for 1994” award for his book Plato’s Socrates (with Thomas Brickhouse). Smith is known for his research on Ancient Greek philosophy.

== Books ==
- Socrates on Self-Improvement: Knowledge, Virtue, and Happiness (Cambridge University Press, 2021)
- Summoning Knowledge in Plato's Republic (Oxford University Press, 2019)
- What the Ancients Offer to Contemporary Epistemology (ed. with S. Hetherington; Routledge, 2019)
- Knowledge in Ancient Philosophy (ed.; vol. 1 in The Philosophy of Knowledge: A History, S. Hetherington, gen. ed., 4 vols. Bloomsbury Press; 2018What.)
- The Bloomsbury Companion to Socrates (ed. with J. Bussanich; Bloomsbury Press, 2013, 421 pp.)
- Knowledge (with I. Evans; Polity Press "Key Concepts" series; 2012, 238 pp.)
- Socratic Moral Psychology (with T. Brickhouse; Cambridge University Press, 2010, 276 pp.)
- Ancient Philosophy: Essential Readings with Commentary (Blackwell Readings in the History of Philosophy series, volume 1; edited; series editors F. Allhoff and A. Vaidya; Blackwell Publishing, 2008, 445 pp.)
- Socrates' Divine Sign: Religion, Practice, and Value in Socratic Philosophy (ed. with P. Destrée, Academic Printing and Publishing [Special Issue of Apeiron], 2005, 180 pp.)
- Routledge Philosophy GuideBook to Plato and the Trial of Socrates (with T. Brickhouse, Routledge 2004, 297 pp.)
- Philosophical Studies vol. 117/1-2, January 2004 (guest editor for Selected Proceedings from American Philosophical Association Pacific Division meetings, 2003; 325 pp.)
- The Trial and Execution of Socrates: Sources and Controversies (ed. and trans. with T. Brickhouse, Oxford University Press, 2002), 286 pp.
- Reason and Religion in Socratic Philosophy (ed. with P. Woodruff, Oxford University Press, 2000, 226 pp.)
- The Philosophy of Socrates (with T. Brickhouse, Westview Press, History of Philosophy series, 2000, 290 pp.)
- Plato: Critical Assessments in four volumes: vol. 1--Problems of Interpretation and Method; vol. 2--- Middle Period: Metaphysics and Epistemology; vol. 3-Plato's Middle Period: Psychology and Value Theory; vol. 4--Plato's Later Works (edited, Routledge, 1998)
- Knowledge, Teaching and Wisdom (edited with K. Lehrer, B. J. Lum, and B. Slichta, Kluwer Academic Publishers, Philosophical Studies series #67, 1996, 288 pp.)
- Plato's Socrates (with T. Brickhouse, Oxford University Press, 1994, 240 pp.)
- Methods of Interpreting Plato and His Dialogues (edited with J. Klagge, Oxford University Press—Oxford Studies in Ancient Philosophy, supplementary volume, 1992, 280 pp.)
- Utopian Studies III and IV (edited with M. Cummings and L. Leibacher-Ouvrard, University Press of America, 1991, 135 pp. and 96 pp. in one cover)--Selected Proceedings/Society for Utopian Studies.
- Socrates on Trial (with T. Brickhouse, Oxford University Press and Princeton University Press, 1989, 316 pp.; trans. into Japanese by T. Mishima and S. Yonezawa, Tokai University Press, 1994, 508 pp.)
- Utopian Studies II (edited with M. Cummings, University Press of America, 1988, 144 pp.)--Selected Proceedings/Society for Utopian Studies.
- Utopian Studies I (edited with G. Beauchamp and K. Roemer, University Press of America, 1987, 197 pp.)--Selected Proceedings/ Society for Utopian Studies.
- Women and Utopia: Critical Interpretations (edited with M. Barr, University Press of America, 1983, 171 pp.)--Selected Proceedings/ Society for Utopian Studies
- Philosophers Look at Science Fiction (edited, Chicago: NelsonHall, 1982, 204 pp.)
- Thought Probes (co-authored/edited with F. Miller, Jr.; Prentice-Hall, 1981, 354 pp.)--Introductory textbook in philosophy. 2nd edition, 1988, 334 pp. Rewritten by Ryan Nicholas and now published as Philosophy through Science Fiction: A Coursebook with Readings, Routledge, 2009.
