= History of Syracuse, Sicily =

History of the municipality of Syracuse, Italy

This article details the history of Syracuse from its origins to the present day.

Located in Sicily, the city was founded in the 8th century BC by a group of Greek colonists from Corinth. It became a prominent polis of significant importance, ranked among the greatest metropolises of the ancient world, and was the birthplace of notable figures such as Epicharmus, Archimedes, and many others. It also hosted influential personalities such as Aeschylus and Plato.

Conquered by the Romans in 212 BC, Syracuse served as the capital of Roman Sicily. It remained important under the Byzantine rule, even briefly becoming the empire's capital from 663 to 669 until the assassination of Emperor Constans II, which led to a drastic shift in its fortunes. The city was then captured by the Arabs in 878, initiating a prolonged decline and loss of its former primacy in Sicily.

In the 11th century, Syracuse was briefly reconquered by the Byzantines before passing to the Normans a few decades later. After a short period of Genoese control in the 13th century, it followed the fortunes of the Kingdom of Sicily. During the 14th, 15th, and early 16th century, it was the seat of the Queen's Chamber, governed by the queens of the Sicilian Kingdom. Subsequently, it became part of the Kingdom of the Two Sicilies until the establishment of the Kingdom of Italy in 1861.

In modern times, Syracuse's history intertwined with that of the rest of Italy, experiencing both the First and Second World Wars. In 2005, its territory was designated a World Heritage Site by UNESCO.

== Prehistory ==
=== Neolithic ===
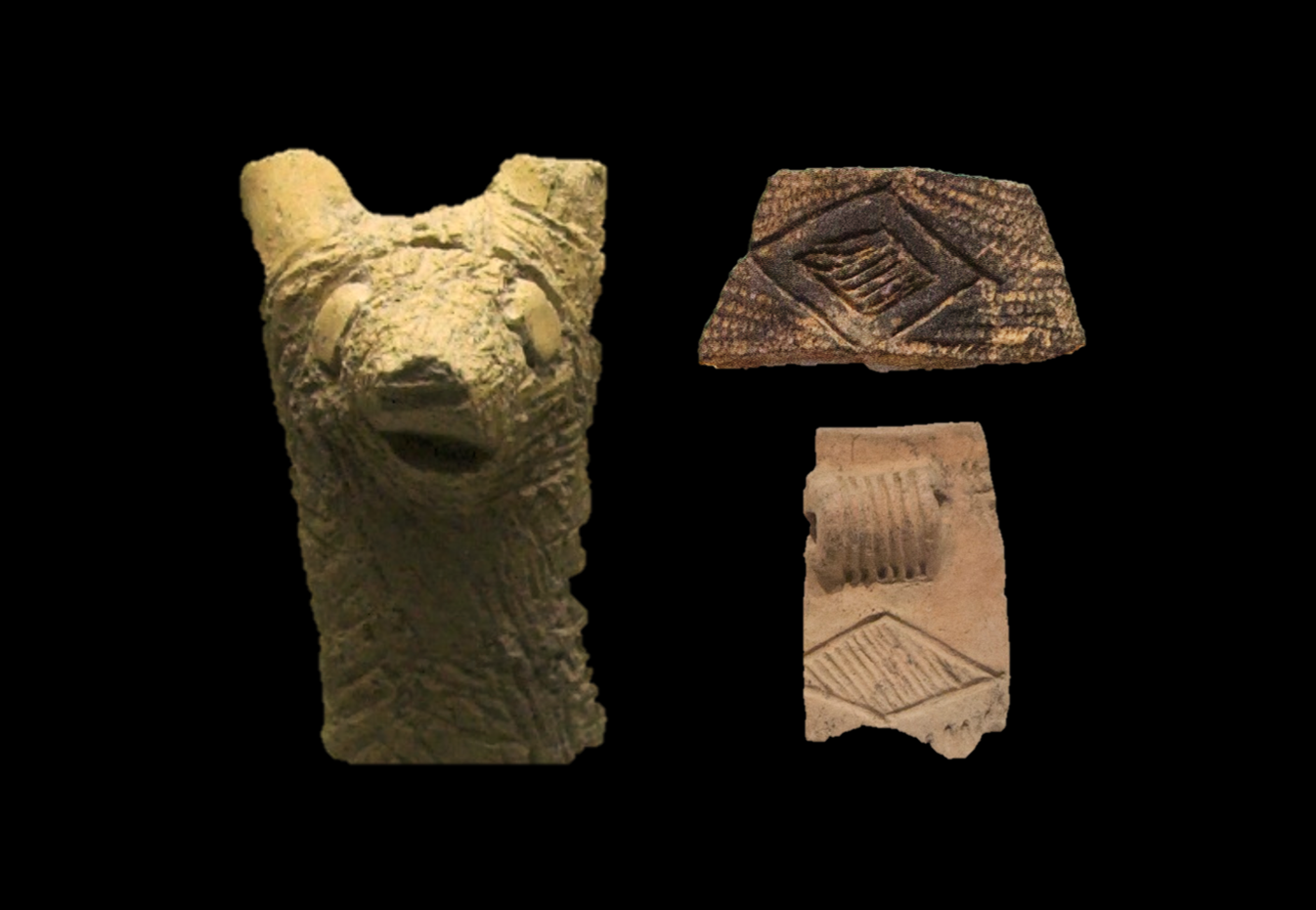
Pottery from Stentinello: on the left, a dog's head; on the right, two depictions of the "divine eye," characteristic elements of the Stentinello culture.

The earliest significant traces of human activity in the Syracuse area date back to the Neolithic period and primarily involve the coastal boundaries of the future city. The most notable archaeological evidence is the fortified village of Stentinello, located on the northern side of Syracuse, between the neighborhoods of Santa Panagia and the district of Targia. Its fortified nature is derived from the various ditches surrounding it. From the same period, though with fewer remains, are the village of Matrensa (or Milocca), the prehistoric sites of Plemmirio and Arenella, and the village of Ognina, which extend along the southern coast from the Maddalena Peninsula to the outskirts of Fontane Bianche.

Discovered by archaeologist Paolo Orsi in 1890, Stentinello is highly significant as it marks the advent of agriculture in Sicily. Dated to around 6000 BC or 5000 BC, the Stentinello culture is considered non-native, as it shows no connections with earlier human populations elsewhere on the island. Despite severe marine erosion and partial submersion of the site (the sea level is currently about 5–6 meters higher than in the first millennium BC), its impressed pottery, described as refined and featuring varied motifs, clearly demonstrates continuity with Neolithic ceramic production prevalent outside Sicily during those millennia. This pottery spread via maritime routes to numerous coastal sites in the Mediterranean Sea and is believed to have originated in the Fertile Crescent, between northern Syria and southern Anatolia. (Note: Archaeologist Luigi Bernabò Brea writes: Within the vast complex of impressed pottery, Stentinello pottery fits perfectly in terms of typology and style, representing one of the most artistically advanced branches of early Neolithic impressed ceramics. This impressed pottery is found in the earliest Neolithic layers uncovered in northern Syria (Ugarit, Indeideh, Byblos, Chagar Bazar, Arpachigah, etc.) and southern Anatolia (Sakçe Gözü and Mesin). — Bernabò Brea (2016, cap. II - Il Neolitico))

Some scholars disagree with classifying the Stentinello people as foreign to the island's context, arguing that the Stentinello culture was not directly imported by sea but spread gradually across Sicily from the interior. (Note: Among the few traces found on the island that may illustrate a gradual internal transition from the Mesolithic to the Neolithic, thus bridging the rest of the island with the Syracuse area, is the Grotta dell'Uzzo in the Trapani area, which has yielded impressed pottery and, in its final phase, Stentinello-style ceramics.)

=== Bronze and Iron Ages ===
Paolo Orsi identified the Stentinello people as older and distinct from the Sicels. According to Orsi, the Sicels succeeded the Stentinello culture and initiated the Bronze Age and Iron Age in Sicily, dividing these periods into four long phases dominated by the Sicels. However, archaeologist Luigi Bernabò Brea, while validating Orsi's periodization, demonstrated that this framework must include a non-Sicel culture responsible for the Castelluccio culture and Thapsos culture, likely originating in the Aegean-Anatolian region. At Thapsos, located just a few kilometers north of Stentinello, Mycenaean remains (dating to 1500 BC) have also been found.

Another exception in the Syracuse area, unrelated to the Sicels during the Bronze Age, is the island of Ognina, believed to have been inhabited during this period by a colony from Malta. (Note: Luigi Bernabò Brea, Pantalica - Ricerche intorno all'anáktoron, 2020, p. 10, n. 19: [...] it is a genuine Maltese colony on the Sicilian coast, giving the impression that maritime trade along it was monopolized by Malta during this period. In this settlement, Maltese pottery of the Tarxien Cemetery style is far more abundant than Sicilian pottery of the Castelluccio style, indicated only by a few fragments.) Several connections exist between the Maltese archipelago and the Syracuse area; for example, both regions feature deep grooves in the limestone known as cart ruts. The cart ruts of Syracuse, primarily located near Stentinello, have been tentatively dated to the time of the Greeks, possibly formed over centuries from the first roads traversed by carts.

Further lowering the dating of the Sicels' arrival in the Syracuse area, beyond some archaeological evidence, are ancient written sources. These indicate that the Sicels, a people from the Italian Peninsula (with substantial evidence of their settlement in Italy, allowing Brea to describe them as a people of "late Apennine" culture, while Greek historiography recounts that their legendary progenitor, Siculus, came from prehistoric Rome), arrived around the mid-2nd millennium BC. Their chronology is tied to the Trojan War: Philistus claims they arrived 80 years before the war against the Trojans, corresponding to 1364 BC. The same dating is supported by Hellanicus of Lesbos, who states the Sicels arrived in the 26th year of Alcyone's priesthood at Argos, three generations before the Trojan War, aligning with Thucydides' chronology of the 80th year before the conflict. Thucydides notes that the Sicels populated eastern Sicily 300 years before the Greeks, who arrived around the 8th century BC.

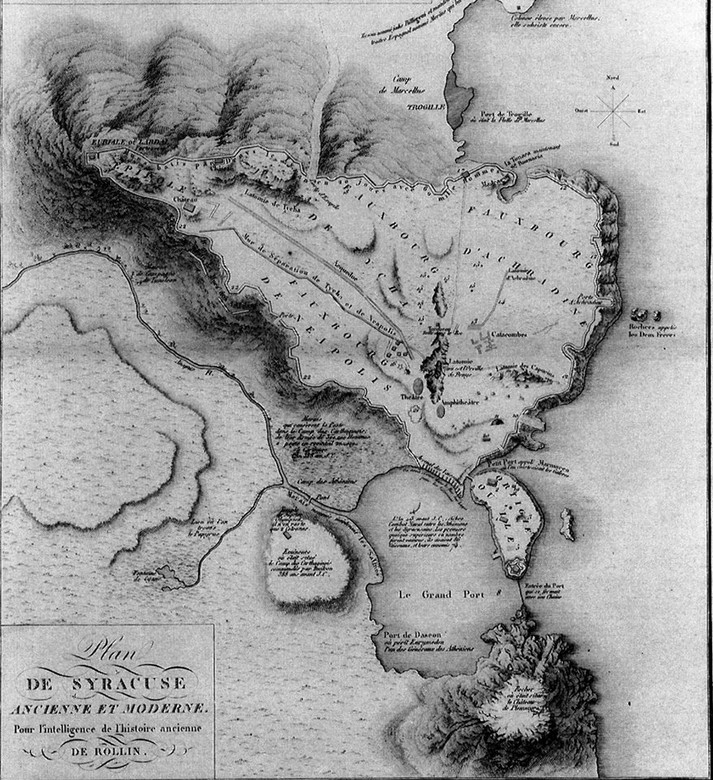
The physical area of Syracuse on an ancient map by French historian Charles Rollin

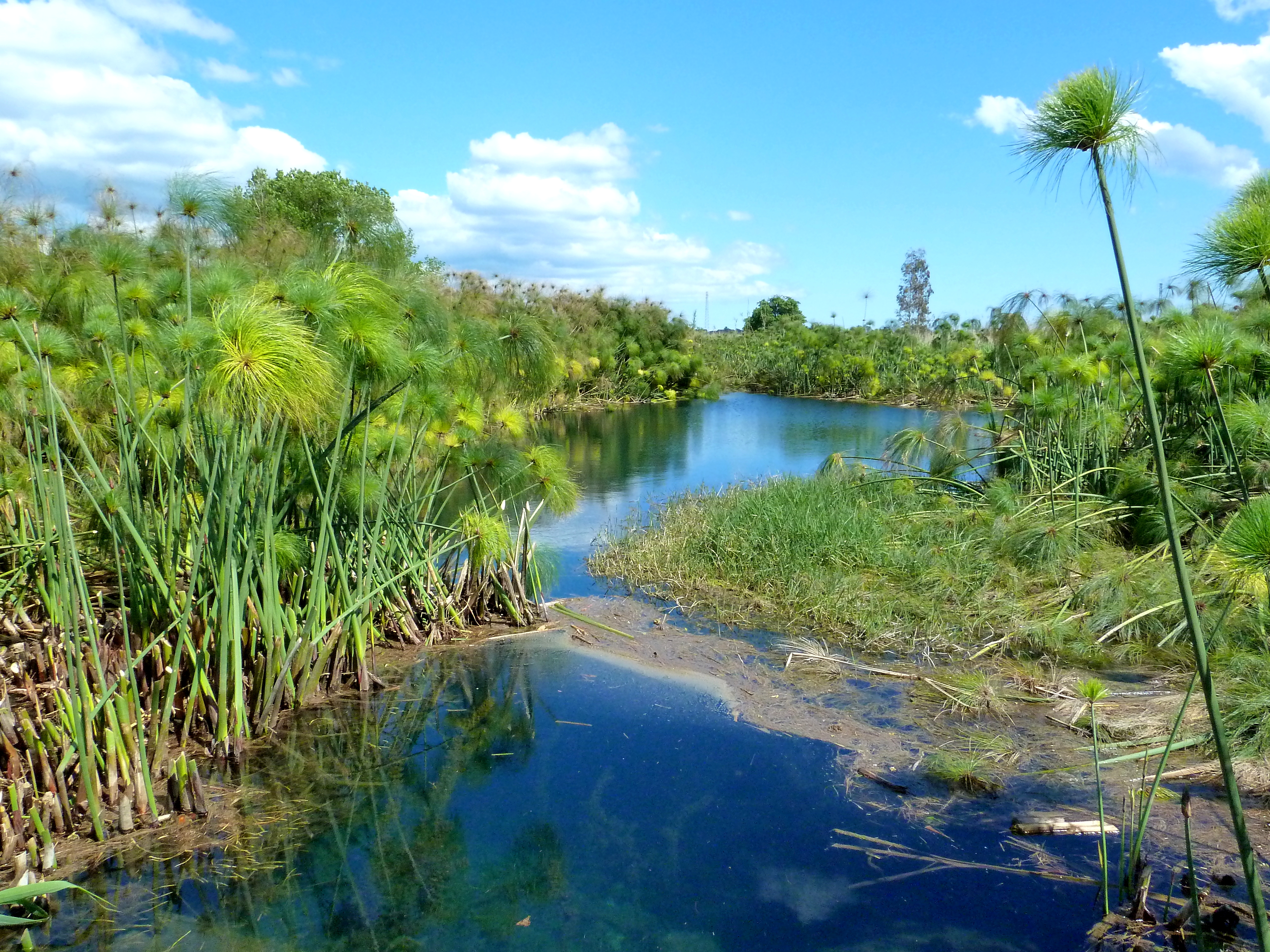
Papyrus at the Ciane River and Salt Pans of Syracuse Nature Reserve: once surrounded by marshes and called Lisimelie (modern Pantanelli). Some sources suggest the presence of the Syraka marsh, from which the city's name may derive.

Both the Cassibile necropolis and the island of Ortygia have yielded numerous Sicel artifacts from the Pantalica culture, named after the Pantalica necropolis in the Hyblaean Mountains, characterized by thousands of rock-cut tombs. Some ancient historians attribute the origin of the city's name to the Sicels, suggesting it emerged as a Sicel colony known as Syraka or Syrako (rendered as Surako and Surakeus in other ancient sources (Note: In the scholia of Callimachus, the term for Syracuse is reported in these two forms; translated from Greek: Συρακώ and Συρακούς. Cf. L'onomastica dell'Italia antica aspetti linguistici, storici, culturali, tipologici e classificatori, École française de Rome, 2009, p. 584 ISBN 9782728307999.)), possibly derived from a marsh of the same name or a similarly named watercourse (based on a report by Duris of Samos, who includes Syracuse among cities named after rivers). (Note: This hypothesis, supported by Duris, has gained traction in recent times. Archaeologist Santi Luigi Agnello examined it in 1969, and his studies have found significant support. Following the ancient Greek historian, Agnello identifies Syrako not as a marsh but as a river, tracing its path to an ancient stream or canal named San Giorgio, which flowed through Acradina and emptied into a marshy area in Syracuse's Lakkios harbor, at the eastern boundary with Ortigia. This river would have fed the marsh, making it a derivative feature.)

The Sicels are credited with founding an ancient indigenous capital called Hybla. This city, whose name has ancient roots in Syria and Anatolia, likely gave its name to the entire Syracuse region, known as Hyblaean, after the nearby mountains. Brea argued that the prehistoric Syraka/o was part of Hybla's domain, serving as its commercial port.

The exact location of this capital, which may have controlled the later Corinthian colony, remains a mystery. However, ancient sources note that there were multiple Hyblas: the closest to Syraka was Megara Hyblaea, where Stentinello culture artifacts have been found, indicating a connection with that area since the Neolithic. Megara Hyblaea was reportedly founded by Hyblon, a presumed mythological figure. Hybla remained linked to Syraka even after the latter adopted Greek customs and language. (Note: Numerous affinities between the Hyblaeans and Syracusans are recorded by ancient historians. For instance, Hybla was the only Sicel city that did not side with Ducetius when he sought to restore indigenous power and conquer Syracuse. Hybla also opposed Athens when it aimed to destroy Syracuse and assume control of the island. Additionally, Hybla (though it is unclear which Hybla) joined the Syracusans in the Panhellenic Games, offering statues to Greek gods, a significant novelty given the Greeks' strict policies toward foreigners.)

== Ancient era ==
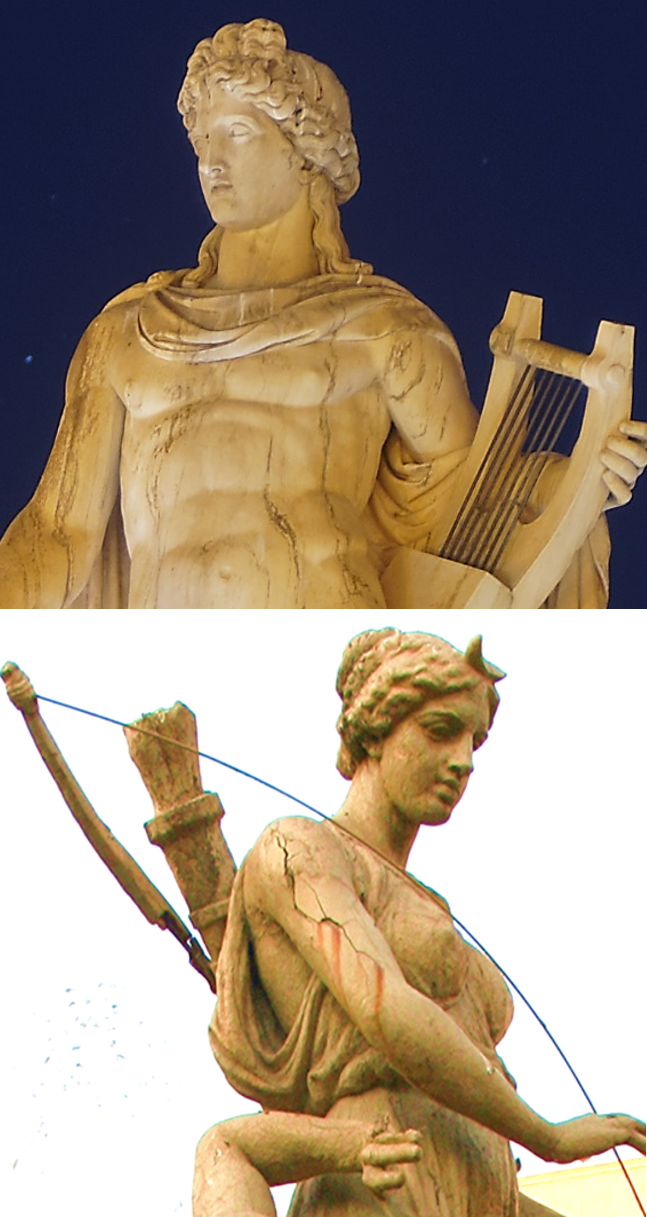
Apollo, god of the Sun, and Artemis, goddess of the Moon: the twin deities of the heavens are closely tied to Syracuse, possibly from its founding; the city's name may also be linked to them.

=== Foundation ===
As is common with the founding of ancient poleis, the founding of Syracuse is subject to differing opinions. Some sources, such as the Marmor Parium, date the founding act (ktisis) to 758 BC, while Thucydides suggests a later date of 733 BC. Others, such as Strabo, propose that Syracuse was colonized alongside Megara Hyblaea, Sybaris, and Crotone, implying a founding after 720 BC. Generally, Thucydides’ date of 733 BC is considered the most reliable.

The colonists who settled in the pre-existing Sicel settlement came from Corinth, in the Peloponnese. Greek historiography records that they were led by Archias of the Bacchiadae, who had ousted the Heracleidae to rule Corinth. These colonists were Dorians by lineage, having earlier invaded Greece and contributed to the collapse of the Mycenaean civilization, ushering in the Greek Dark Ages. The Doric dialect would characterize Syracuse in the centuries to come.

Archias also brought another lineage: most of the colonists on his ships were reportedly descendants of survivors of the Trojan War, originating from Tenea in Corinth. (Note: The ancestors of these Trojans (originally from the Hellespont, Anatolia), settled by Agamemnon in the Corinthian region, inhabited Tenea, located between Corinth and Mycenae. Recent archaeological excavations have confirmed the historical existence of the site, previously considered mythological.) It has been suggested that the Teneans may have introduced the cult of the sun god Apollo to Syracuse. (Note: Pausanias (Description of Greece, II, 5, 4) states that, as Trojans, the Teneans revered Apollo above all other gods, as he had supported the Trojans during the war. The Teneans may have transferred this Apollonian cult to their new polis in the West.)

Archias consulted the Oracle of Delphi, where the priestess of Apollo instructed him to settle on the island of Ortygia. An inscription found at Naxos, the oldest Greek colony in Sicily, reveals that the first colonists to land on Sicilian shores regarded Apollo as their protector, the Archegetes of Greek colonization in the West and "lord of the tribes." Different accounts exist regarding how and why Archias reached the Delphic oracle. According to Strabo, he visited it alongside Myscellus, the founder of Crotone. When the sibyl asked what he desired most for his future colony, Archias chose wealth (while Myscellus chose health), and the god granted him the land of Syracuse, whose wealth became legendary in the ancient world.

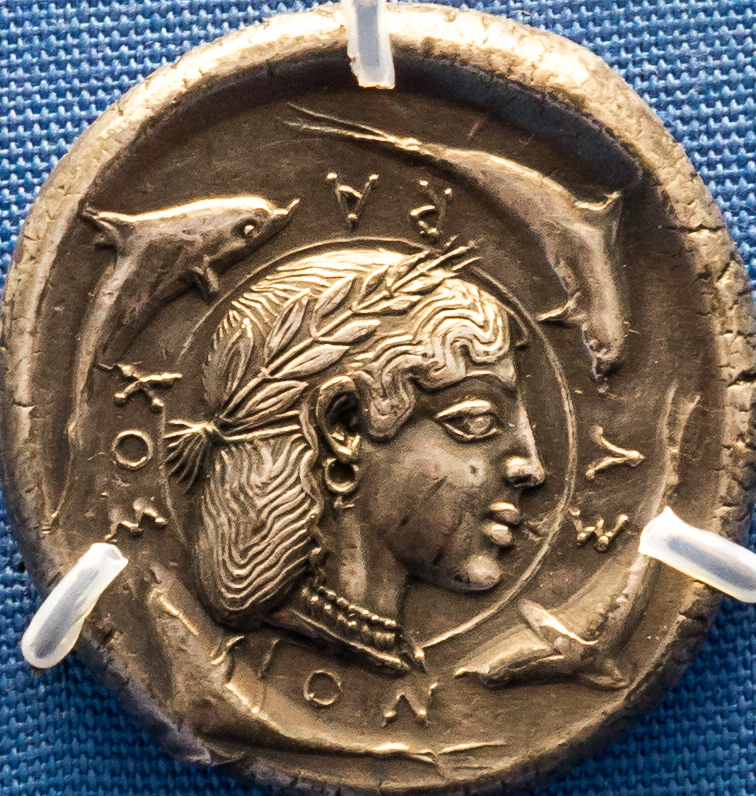
Syracusan coin from the 5th century BC: the nymph Arethusa surrounded by dolphins and the inscription SY-RA-KOS-ION

The island of Ortygia was linked by the first colonists to the lunar cult of Artemis. The name "Ortygia" recalls the homeland where the Titan Leto gave birth to the twins of Zeus, Apollo and Artemis. In antiquity, there were several places named Ortygia (today, only Syracuse's island retains the name). The Ortygia associated with the sacred birth later became known as Delos, the "luminous" island, while other Ortygias faded into history. The Sicilian Ortygia has often been associated with the Homeric Ortygia (Ὀρτυγίης), linked to a city called "Syria" (Συρίη), noted as the place "where the sun turns." It is also tied to Apollo and Artemis. (Note: The full Homeric text (translated by Greek scholar Vincenzo Di Benedetto) reads: There is an island called Syria, if you have ever heard of it, beyond Ortygia, where the sun reverses. It is not particularly populous, but it is good land, rich in pastures and flocks, abundant in wine and grain. Hunger never enters the territory, nor does any hateful disease that afflicts wretched mortals. But there, when the generations of men grow old, Apollo of the silver bow arrives with Artemis, striking and killing them with his merciful darts. There are two cities there, and everything is divided equally between them: both were ruled by my father, Ctesius Ormenides, akin to the immortals. — Homer, Odyssey, book XV, vv. 402-414)

Although the location of Homer's passage remains uncertain due to the many homonymous Ortygias and Syrias in antiquity, some scholars consider the Homeric reference valid for tracing the origins of Syracuse's toponyms. For instance, it is widely accepted that "Ortygia" means "quail" in ancient Greek (ὄρτυξ), but it has been suggested that the name was given not for the bird's appearance but for its rotational movement, its rising at dawn, essentially as a "solar emblem." This could connect to the solar inversion mentioned by Homer. Another Homeric passage supports the idea of the sun's rebirth being tied to Ortygia, as it places the deeds of Eos, the goddess of dawn, within it.

Accounts of the colony's early life vary. It is presumed that there was initially peaceful coexistence between the Sicels and Greeks, which later turned to conflict when the colonists attempted to subjugate the indigenous population. (Note: It is suggested that the Corinthians arrived at Syraka without women (as was common in Aegean colonial expeditions), and initial conflicts arose when the warriors sought wives. While early Corinthian society may have been "mixed," the Greeks later closed off to the indigenous population, excluding them from marital practices and dividing the Aretusean polis into two social classes (evident in the hostilities between Killichirioi and Geōmóroi).) (Note: The significant role of the Sicel element in Syracuse's formation is evident in Thucydides, who notes that the Athenians, preparing to attack Sicily, considered Syracuse weak due to the non-Greek origins of many of its inhabitants, who had intermingled with the locals. Conversely, for the Syracusan Hermocrates, this was a source of pride and propaganda, as he declared the existence of the Siceliotes (part Greek, part Sicel), attempting, though unsuccessfully, to rally Sicily against Athens as an overbearing invasive force.) Apart from anecdotes about Archias’ companions (Aethiopus, Melitutus, Bellerophon, Eumelus, and Telephus, who reportedly killed the Bacchiad after the founding) and a possible archaic Argive king who governed the new polis, there are no historical sources detailing the first two centuries of the colony's existence.

However, Syracuse appears early on the list of Western poleis that triumphed in the ancient Olympic games. In 648 BC, at the 33rd Olympiad, the Syracusan Lygdamis won the inaugural pankration competition (a discipline considered a precursor to martial arts), making Syracuse the second Western city to have its name recorded at the games in Olympia, following Crotone in 672 BC.

A deep connection existed between Syracuse and Olympia, the land of Elis and the mythical seat of the gods of Olympus. It was said that a cup thrown into the Alpheios in Olympia would resurface in the waters of Syracuse, and sacrifices performed in the same river would turn the Fountain of Arethusa red, symbolizing the bond between the Aegean and Sicilian lands. Arethusa was said to have originated in Olympia, as was her suitor Alpheus.

Archaeologists attribute the collapse of major Sicel centers, such as Pantalica, to Syracuse's expansion, which favored Greek culture over the Sicel civilization. The Syracusans established their first sub-colonies in the Hyblaean Mountains.

=== Greek era ===
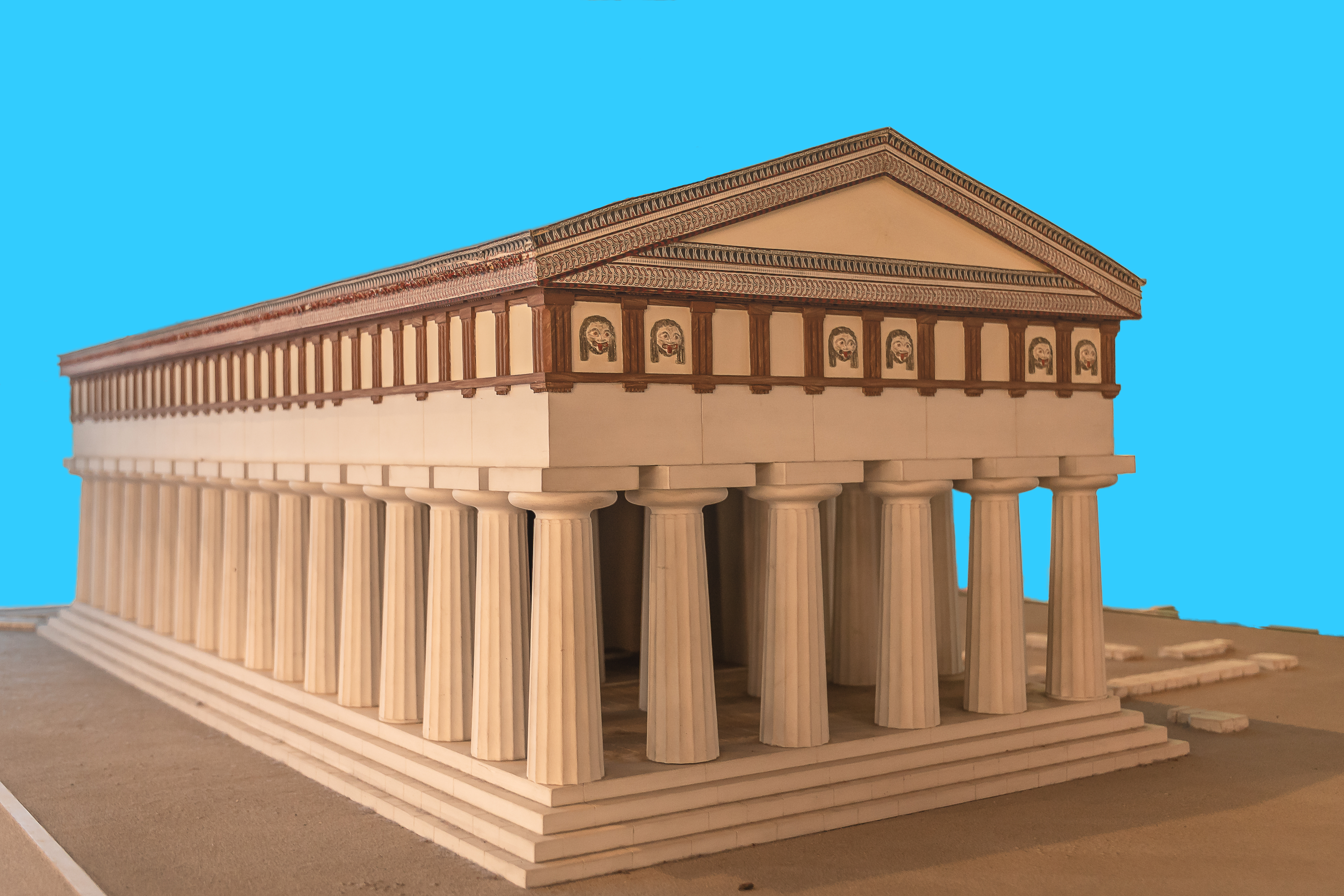
Model reconstruction (Paolo Orsi Regional Archaeological Museum): the Temple of Apollo (Apollónion) as it likely appeared when intact, built on Ortygia in the 6th century BC in Doric style.

The earliest historical records of Greek Syracuse concern internal conflicts between the Killichirioi and the Geōmóroi. The former were descendants of the Sicels, representing the Hellenized popular class, while the latter descended from Corinthian colonists, becoming the landowning elite of the new polis. The Killichirioi succeeded in ousting the Geōmóroi from power, but the exiled Geōmóroi, in 485 BC, sought refuge in Gela, a powerful polis of Rhodian-Cretan origin, and requested aid from the ruling Deinomenid family.

Gela, under its tyrant Hippocrates, had previously attempted to seize Syracuse. In 492 BC, Hippocrates defeated the Syracusans in the Battle of the Helorus River, where Chromius of Aetna and Gelon of the Deinomenids distinguished themselves among Gela's ranks. Syracuse would have been at his mercy had Hippocrates not died attempting to conquer Hybla.

Before Hybla intervened, both Corinth and Corcyra reportedly acted to prevent the weak Corinthian colony from being occupied, negotiating with Gela by offering a Syracusan sub-colony, Kamarina, in exchange for peace, which then became part of Gela. (Note: The intervention of Corinth and Corcyra on Syracuse's behalf is questioned by some modern scholars, as while Herodotus mentions it, Thucydides and Philistus curiously omit this diplomatic move. There is suspicion that the only factor preventing Hippocrates from occupying Syracuse was the resilience of Hybla's Sicels, still formidable. Cf. Daniela Sinatra, Camarina: città di frontiera? in Hesperia 9, ed. Lorenzo Braccesi, 1998, pp. 53-53.)

About a decade later, Gelon skillfully gained entry to Syracuse without force, mediating the dispute between the Killichirioi and Geōmóroi and securing his appointment as strategòs autokrátor, becoming the first tyrant of Syracuse. The seat of power shifted from Gela to Syracuse, though Gela remained independent.

Under Gelon, the centuries-long conflict with Punic Carthage, the new capital of the Phoenicians, began. Carthage had established colonies in western Sicily, and Syracuse, allied with other Greek Sicilian cities (when not in conflict with them), became a frontier against Carthaginian ambitions to conquer the island militarily. Its resistance proved crucial in balancing cultural influences in Sicily and the Western Greek world.

Gelon reorganized and strengthened the Syracusan army and equipped the polis with a formidable navy. Ancient sources report that in 480 BC, on the same day the Siceliotes defeated the Carthaginian king Hamilcar I (whose mother was Syracusan) in the Battle of Himera, mainland Greeks defeated the Persians of Xerxes I at the Battle of Salamis. This simultaneity led Gelon to decline participation in the latter, despite invitations from Sparta’s ambassadors. (Note: Other accounts suggest Gelon refused to aid the mainland Greeks because neither Athens nor Sparta agreed to grant him supreme command of land operations: So long as you demanded command over all Greece, we Athenians had enough of remaining silent, knowing that Sparta’s ambassador would suffice to protect the interests of both cities. But since, having been denied supreme command, you request leadership of the fleet, here is the situation: even if Sparta’s envoy granted you this command, we would certainly not allow it [...] — Athenians to Gelon in Herodotus, VIII, 161. Consequently, the Syracusan tyrant sent no military aid. This episode is complex, with doubts surrounding it. For instance, it has been suggested that the Syracusans attempted a secret pact with Xerxes, sending gifts to ensure that if the Greeks lost, Xerxes would not attack Sicily, as Gelon was not his enemy.)

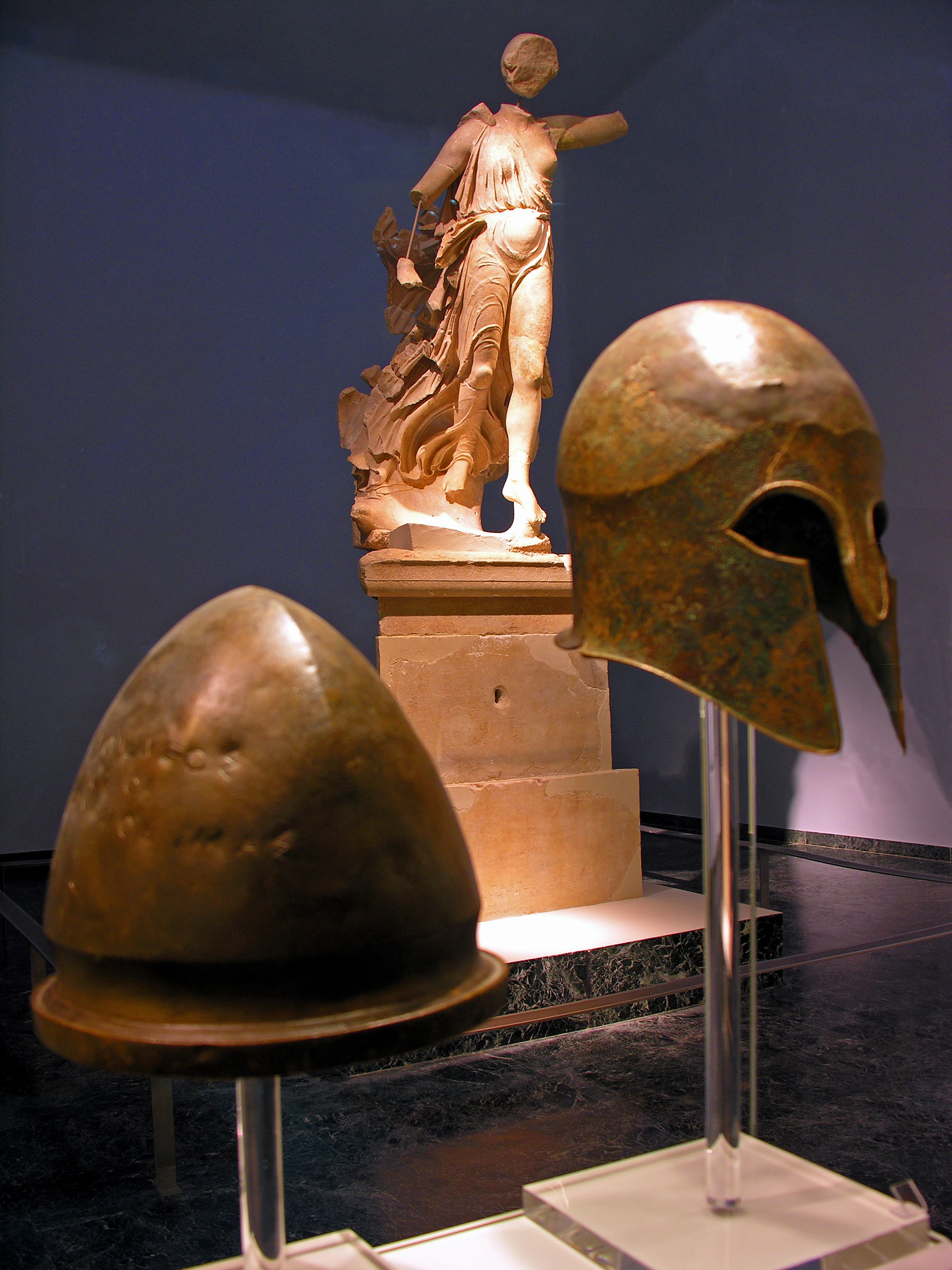
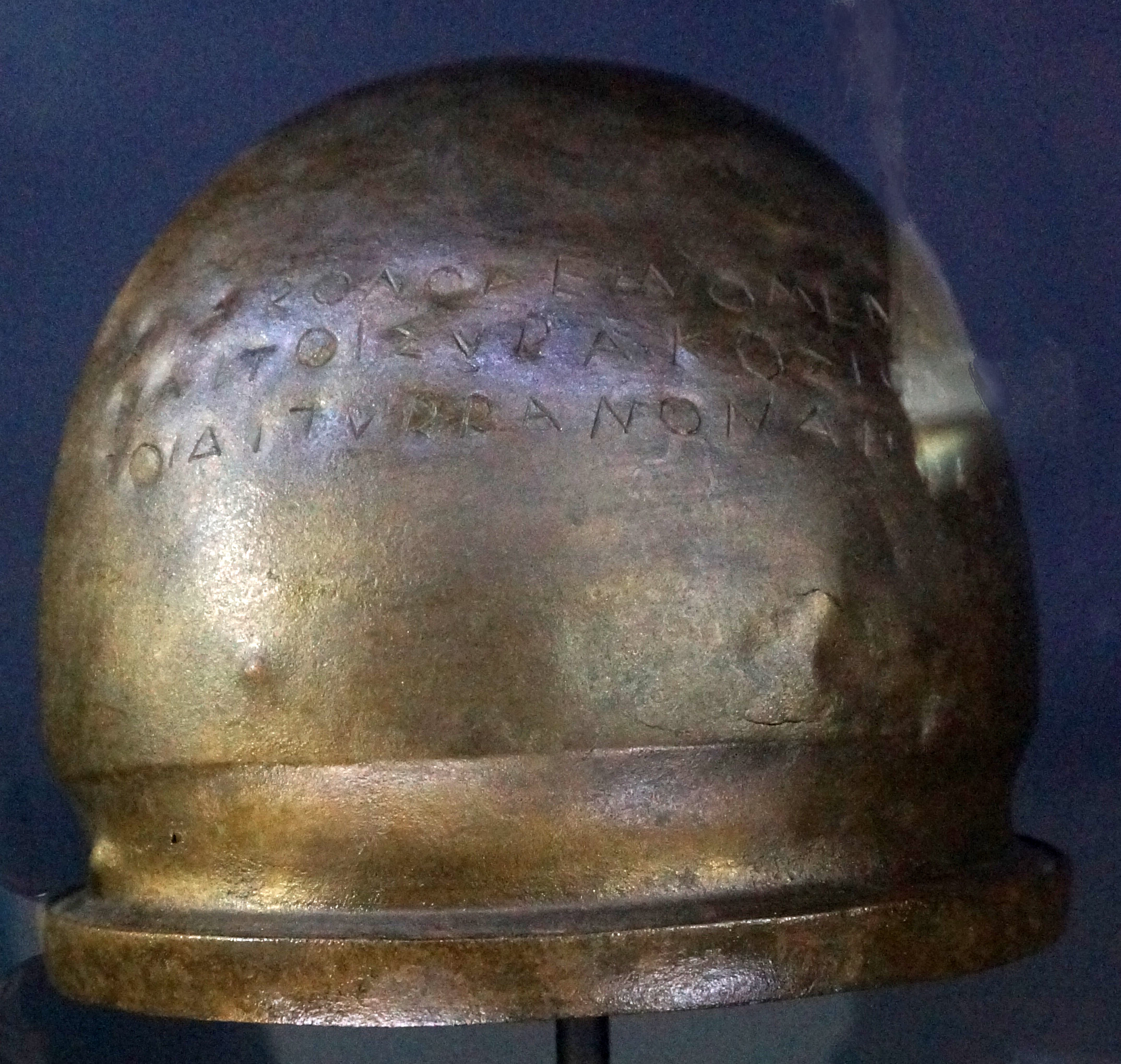
Helmets dedicated by Hieron of Syracuse to Zeus in his Olympic temple for the victory over the Etruscans at Cumae (displayed at the Archaeological Museum of Olympia (Note: The inscription on the helmet reads: Hieron, son of Deinomenes, and the Syracusans to Zeus, from the Tyrrhenians at Cumae ΗΙΑΡΟΝ Ο ΔΕΙΝΟΜΕΝΕΟΣ / ΚΑΙ ΤΟΙ ΣΙΡΑΚΟΣΙΟΙ / ΤΟΙ ΔΙ ΤΙΡΡΑΝΟΝ ΑΠΟ ΚΥΜΑΣ — Votive helmet of Hieron at Olympia.))

A significant outcome of the Siceliot victory over Carthage was a 70-year peace treaty, as reported by Plutarch, imposed by the strategòs of Gela on behalf of Sicily. The treaty required the Carthaginians to cease human sacrifice to their gods, deemed unacceptable by Greek society. The philosopher-jurist Montesquieu of the Age of Enlightenment called it "the finest peace treaty [...] in favor of humanity," benefiting even the Carthaginians. While some modern scholars question the treaty's existence and the practice of sacrifice among the Punics, sufficient ancient sources confirm its historicity. In later Greco-Punic wars, Syracusans repeatedly fell victim to renewed Carthaginian sacrificial practices. (Note: Persian king Darius I had previously attempted to dissuade the Carthaginians from such sacrifices before Gelon formalized it (Marcus Junianus Justinus, XIX 1, 10-13). Notable episodes involving Syracuse include Hannibal Mago’s mass sacrifice in 409 BC of 3,000 Siceliot prisoners in Himera to avenge his grandfather Hamilcar's death and retaliate against Gelon (Diod. Sic. XIII 62.5). Later, when Agathocles reached Carthage's gates in Africa, its inhabitants, in panic to appease their gods (likely Moloch, Melqart, or Kronos), sacrificed themselves, some voluntarily (Diod. Sic., XX 14, 4). Shortly after, Syracusan soldiers captured after Agathocles’ defeat were chosen for sacrifice due to their beauty to thank the Phoenician deity for the victory (Diod. Sic., XX 65, 1).)

With Hieron I (nicknamed "the Aetnean" for his activities around Catania and Mount Etna (Note: Opinions differ on when Hieron earned this epithet, but it likely occurred when he was crowned with laurel at the Pythian Games in honor of Apollo Pythius, as recorded by Pindar, who passed it down to posterity (in Pythian I, Pindar presents Hieron as the defender of Zeus's cosmic order). Scholars note that Pindar places the tomb of the giant Typhon, Zeus's enemy, under both Mount Etna and Cumae, a Campanian site linked to Hieron. "Aetnean" reflects Hieron's refounding of Catania as Aetna, expelling its Ionian population and replacing them with Dorians. The Catanians later reclaimed their city, expelling the Dorians to Inessa on Sicily's highest active volcano, which they renamed Aetna (Aitna).)), brother of Gelon, the conflict extended to the Tyrrhenian Sea. Syracuse halted the southward expansion of the Etruscans (allied with Carthage), defeating them in the Battle of Cumae, a turning point in Roman history, as Rome began to break free from Etruscan dominance. (Note: Cf. Kathryn Lomas, L’ascesa e la gloria di Roma antica, 2018, cap. 10 Roma in marcia: le guerre nel Lazio e oltre, 500-350; Mario Attilio Levi, La città antica, 1989, p. 343. Some scholars argue this marked the shift of thalassocracy (sea control) from the Etruscans and Carthaginians to the Syracusans: André Piganiol & Filippo Coarelli, Le conquiste dei romani. Fondazione e ascesa di una grande civiltà, 2010, p. 63; Storia del Mediterraneo nell'antichità (ed. Massimo Guidetti), 2004, p. 90.)

After defeating the last Sicel king, Ducetius, who attempted to overthrow Greek power in Sicily (460 BC), Syracuse was embroiled in the Peloponnesian War from 427 BC to 413 BC. Initially, Athens, now a rival to Sparta for Aegean hegemony, fought Syracuse at the instigation of Leontini, leveraging Athens’ Ionian roots to subdue the Dorian city in the West. Syracuse resisted, leading to a peace agreement in 424 BC (Peace of Gela). A second Athenian attack came unexpectedly, as opening a Western front while Athens was engaged in its homeland was deemed unlikely. Yet, reports of a major naval expedition to Sicily proved true.

Thucydides, describing the Syracusans as "profoundly similar" to the Athenians (omoiotropoi) due to their shared vitality and ambition, identified imperialism as Athens’ fatal flaw.

In 415 BC, the Greek expedition, predominantly Athenian and the largest ever assembled (except in Homeric accounts), began inauspiciously. From the war's outset, Athens felt unsupported by the gods, notably due to the Oracle of Delphi’s opposition. (Note: From the war's start, Delphi sided with Sparta, with the Pythia declaring that Apollo would aid the Spartans, invoked or not. This shocked Athens, which blamed Apollo (god of medicine) when a plague struck in 430 BC, Europe's first documented pestilence. Relations remained tense: Athens, unable to abandon Apollo's cult, unsuccessfully tried to replace the Pythian Apollo with the Delian one (from ancient Ortygia). Before the Sicilian expedition, Delphi ordered Athens to send a priestess of Athena, urging them not to depart. Athens dismissed this, claiming Delphi was corrupted by Syracuse. A war of oracles ensued: for instance, Alcibiades claimed the Oracle of Amun in Egypt assured Athens’ subjugation of Syracuse.) The expedition was further marred by the desecration of the Hermae (statues of Hermes, god of the logos, psychopomp, and divine messenger) and insults to the Eleusinian Mysteries, leading to the condemnation of Socrates’ circle and his disciple Alcibiades, who had spearheaded the war against Syracuse.

Nicias, author of the broken peace, opposed the Sicilian campaign and feared divine retribution. In 413 BC, realizing Syracuse could not be conquered, he decided to return home, but a lunar eclipse on August 27 interpreted as ominous by his seers delayed the departure, leading to the total defeat of the Athenian forces, encircled and vanquished on both sea and land.

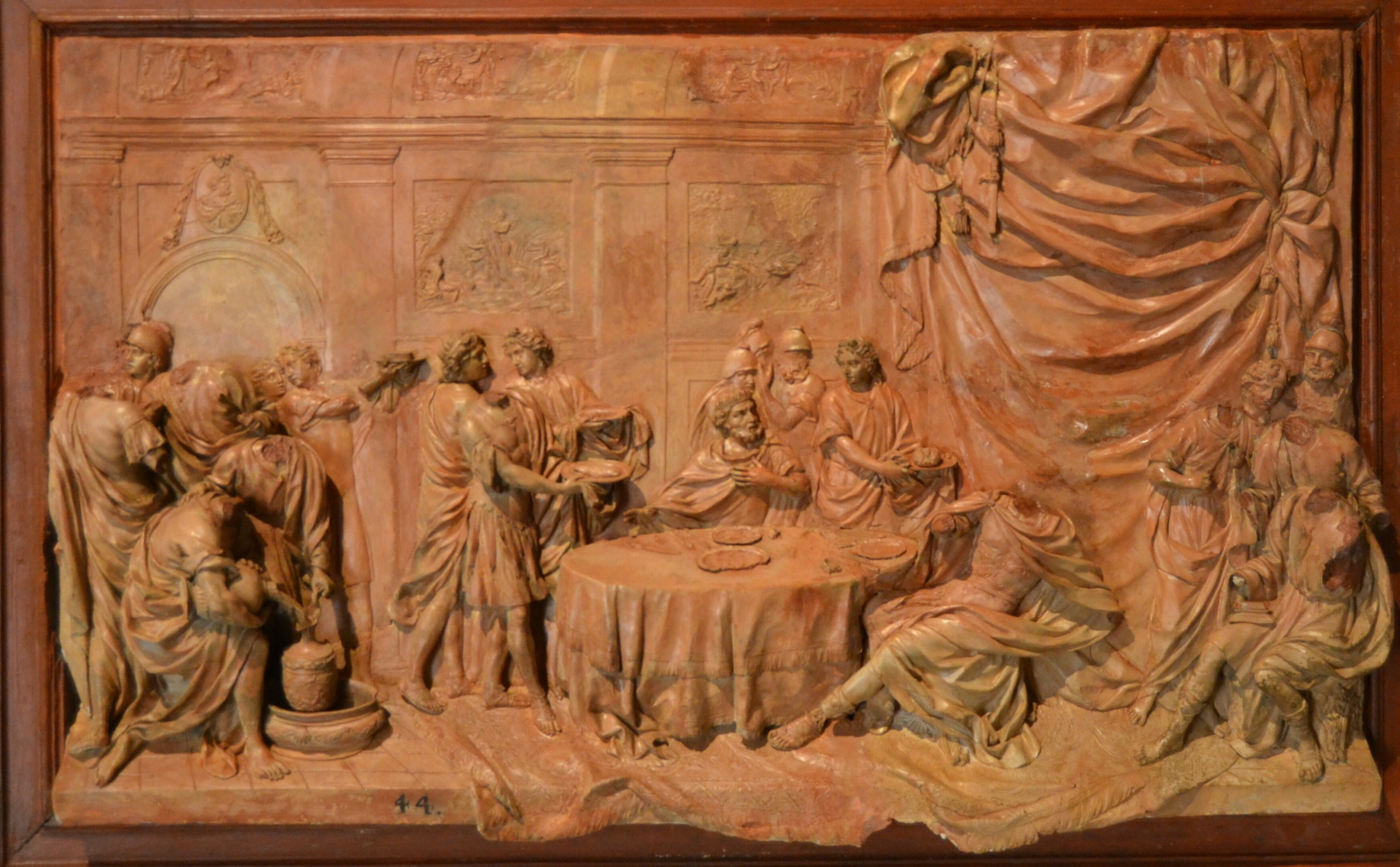
The episode of the Sword of Damocles at Dionysius’ court (18th-century sculpture by Josep Ginés Marín, Acadèmia de Belles Arts de San Fernando)

The Dionysian era, in the 4th century BC, marked Syracuse's most prosperous period, becoming a pentapolis. However, it began with the harsh resumption of conflict with Carthage, including a new siege of the polis by the shophet Himilco II, thwarted by an epidemic in the Carthaginian camp.

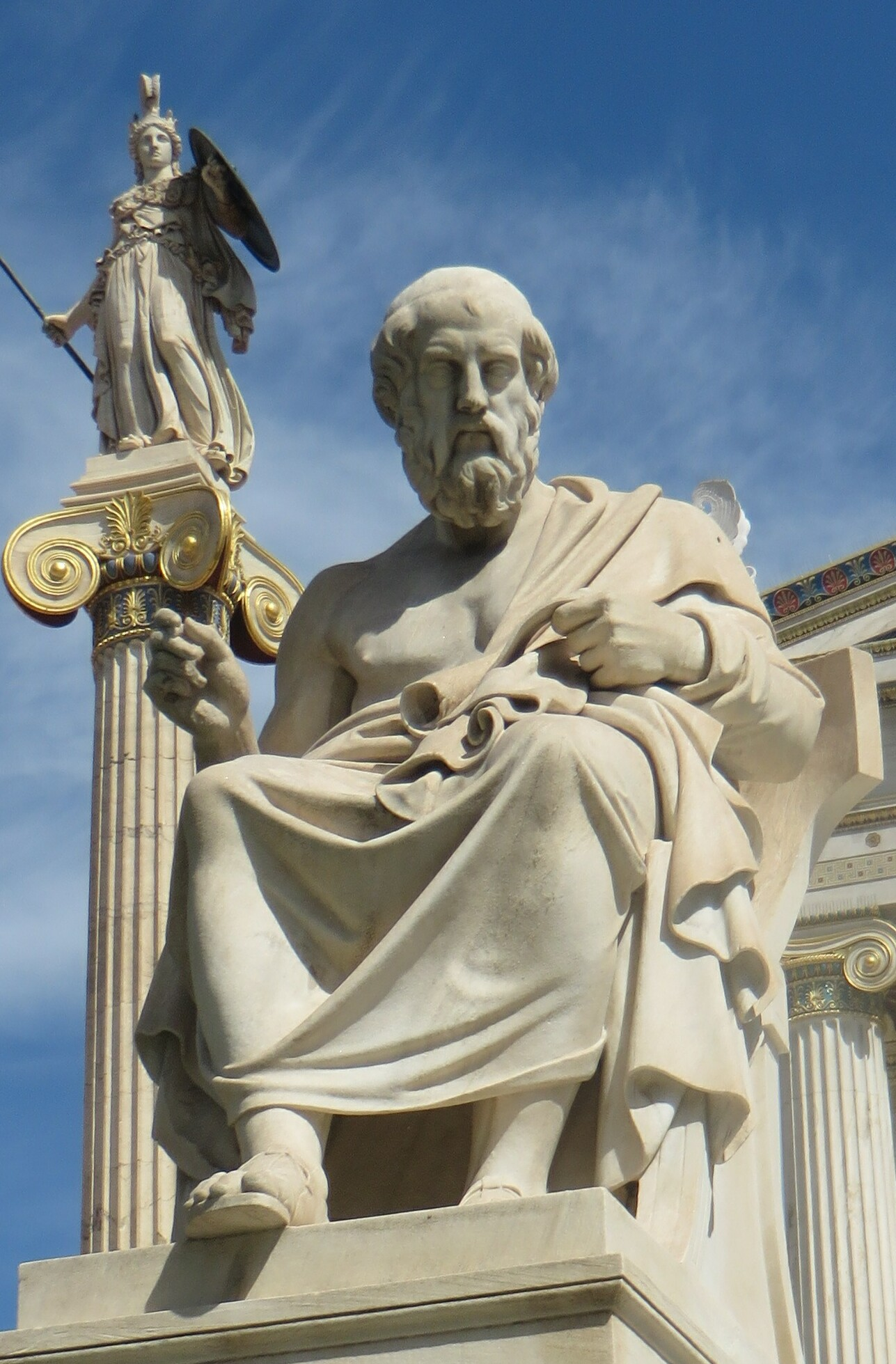
Bust of Plato (New Academy of Athens, Leonidas Drosis, 19th century). The philosopher profoundly influenced the Dionysian era and its end.

Thanks to its acquired thalassocracy and numerous commercial emporia, Syracuse reached its peak of wealth. Dionysius I gained favor with non-Greeks, forming alliances with the Gauls after the sack of Rome and employing Hyblaean seers, the Galeotae, who, claiming descent from Hyperborean Apollo, linked Syracusans to the Gauls, facilitating Dionysius’ influence in their lands.

Defeating Athens enhanced Syracuse's prestige, attracting poets, artists, and philosophers, notably Plato. The Athenian, a disciple of Socrates, visited Sicily three times and was a guest at the Syracusan court.

Despite Plato's presence, tensions persisted between Syracuse and Athens, and possibly Sparta. During the 98th Olympiad (388 BC), Dionysius was publicly accused of desiring a Greece in flames to divide with the King of Kings, Artaxerxes II. Suspicions lingered that Syracusans colluded with Persians, as they never fought them. (Note: The first historical contact between Persia and Syracuse dates to Gelon, who sent gold to Xerxes via Cadmus of Kos (to be delivered only if Persia won). Later, Hermocrates, during the Syracusan Aegean campaign, gained Persian support. Dionysius I participated in the King's Peace alongside Persia, and contacts between Dionysius II of Syracuse and Artaxerxes II are documented. See Vanotti, I rapporti tra la Persia e Siracusa (Sordi, In limine), p. 59; Muccioli, Dionisio II e il Gran Re in Dionisio II: Storia e tradizione, p. 228.) It was not until 368 BC that Greece ceased viewing Dionysius as an enemy, when he joined Aegean military campaigns. That year, Athens declared Dionysius and his descendants "allies [of the Athenians] for eternity."

Scholars note that Plato saw Syracuse as the new center of Aegean power and sought to transform its tyrannical government into one closer to his Ideal state ideals, though the extent of his intended reforms remains debated. Neither Dionysius I nor his son Dionysius II embraced his teachings. However, Plato influenced Dion (Dionysius’ brother-in-law), who, supported by the Platonic Academy, overthrew Dionysius II, sparking the civil war in the polis (357 BC). The Corinthian Timoleon, also Platonist, later took power.

Another civil war in 316 BC granted Agathocles the title of strategòs autokrátor. Under his leadership, the conflict with Carthage peaked. While Carthage besieged the polis, Agathocles broke the naval blockade and led his troops to Africa, marking the first time Carthage was besieged on its own soil. Agathocles’ expedition had broader significance for Hellenism, inspired by Alexander the Great’s conquests, as Macedonia expanded Greek cultural boundaries. In Africa, Agathocles allied with Alexander's former Diadochi: Ptolemy I Soter, satrap of Egypt (with whom he formed a familial tie, creating a lineage that persisted in Egypt), and Ophellas, governor of Cyrene, later betrayed by Agathocles.

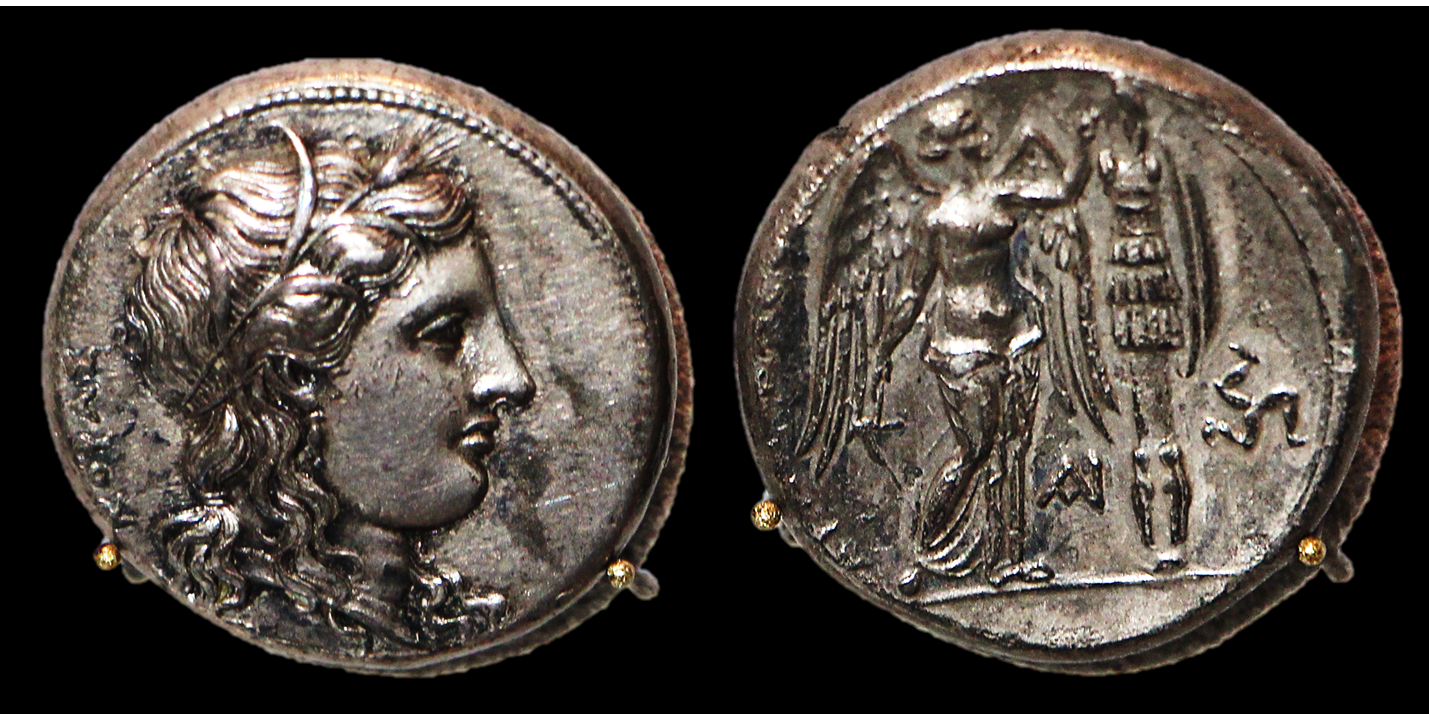
Syracusan coin minted by Agathocles in 308 BC: on the left, the goddess Persephone; on the right, Nike with armor and the triskelion, a symbol of Sicily.

In the Mediterranean context, in 307 BC, Agathocles, like the Macedonian Diadochi in their territories, assumed the title of basileus of Sicily, becoming the island's first king.

After initial successes, the siege of Carthage faltered due to discord between Agathocles and his army, leading to their return and his brutal revenge on the Syracusans.

In the Ionian Sea, Syracusans defeated the ships of Cassander, King of Macedon. Agathocles then turned to Magna Graecia, defending Greek culture and his domains while engaging with Italic peoples. Some scholars interpret his final moves as anti-Roman, though no direct conflict with Rome occurred. The next basileus, Hieron II, who rose to power in 269 BC, could not avoid confrontation with Rome. Distinguished in Pyrrhus’ army (Pyrrhus, Agathocles’ son-in-law and father of Alexander II, had sought Syracuse's throne), Hieron II fought the Mamertines ("sons of Mars"), Campanian mercenaries of Agathocles who settled in Sicily after the army's disbandment. They caught the Syracusans off guard, calling on Rome for support due to shared Italic origins.

The Mamertines also appealed to Carthage to defeat Hieron, who had besieged their stronghold in Messina. This led to simultaneous Roman and Carthaginian intervention in Sicily, but with conflicting goals, sparking the Punic Wars over the island's control. Syracuse was caught between them, forced to choose sides, unable to confront both.

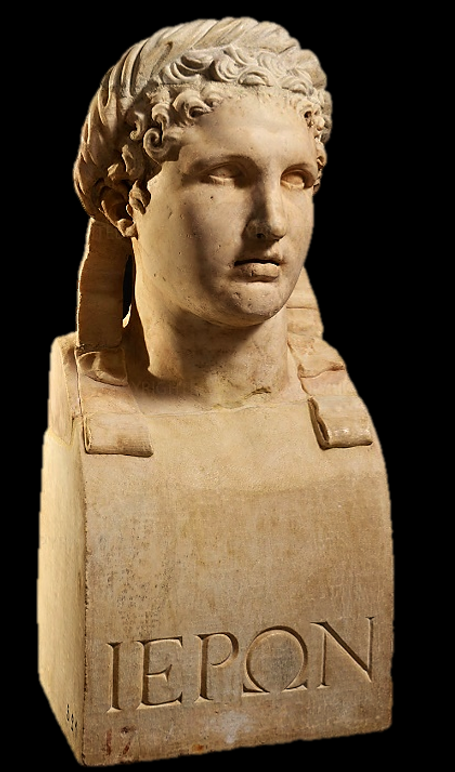
The herm of a heroic (or divine) figure, found in Rome, dating back to the 2nd century, attributed to the ally of the Roman people, Hiero II of Syracuse

Initially, Rome appeared a greater threat than Carthage, prompting Syracuse to ally with the latter. However, Hieron reversed this decision after battling Roman consul Caudex and facing sieges by consuls Messalla and Crassus, supported by four legions and several Sicilian cities. He broke the alliance with Carthage and joined Rome. (Note: Despite an early stereotype portraying Hieron II as a loyal Roman ally—a view supported by his consistent aid to Rome—he initially opposed Rome's intervention to protect the Mamertines. His words to the Romans, recorded by Diodorus Siculus (XXIII 1.4.), state: The Mamertines, who devastated Camarina and Gela and seized Messina most impiously, are justly besieged, while the Romans, who proclaim the word fides, must not shield murderers who utterly despise fides. If they undertake such a serious war to defend the impious, it will be clear to all that they use compassion for those in danger as a pretext for their insatiable greed, while in reality, they desire Sicily. Μαμερτῖνοι Καμάριναν καὶ Γέλαν ἀναστάτους πεποιηκότες, Μεσσήνην δὲ ἀσεβέστατα κατειληφότες, δικαίως πολιορκοῦνται, Ῥωμαῖοι δέ, θρυλλοῦντες τὸ τῆς πίστεως ὄνομα, παντελῶς οὐκ ὀφείλουσι τοὺς μιαιφόνους, μάλιστα πίστεως καταφρονήσαντας, ὑπερασπίζειν· εἰ δὲ ὑπὲρ ἀσεβεστάτων τηλικοῦτον ἐπαναιροῦνται πόλεμον, φανεροὺς ἔσεσθαι πᾶσιν ἀνθρώποις ὅτι τῆς ἰδίας πλεονεξίας πρόφασιν πορίζονται τὸν τῶν κινδυνευόντων ἔλεον, τὸ δὲ ἀληθὲς Σικελίας ἐπιθυμοῦσιν. — Hiero II of Syracuse to the Romans.)

This alliance brought Syracuse a long period of peace. No longer possessing its former military might, exhausted after Agathocles, and relieved of defending Sicily from Carthaginian ambitions (now Rome's concern), Hieron and his people focused on expanding trade with other Hellenistic kingdoms. Rome preserved Syracuse's autonomy, granting control over much of eastern Sicily (the Kingdom of Hieron II) and requiring no tribute. From 248 BC, Rome established a "perpetuam amicitiam" with Hieron. In this climate, Archimedes ("The Foresighted" or "Leader of Thought") thrived, serving the basileus by fortifying the pentapolis for future attacks.

The peace with Rome did not last as hoped. After Hieron's death in 215 BC, the Syracusans violently ended his dynasty. Resenting Rome's growing dominance, they sought Carthage again, then engaged in the Second Punic War. This second alliance with Carthage provoked Rome's wrath, leading to a resolute siege of the polis. (Note: It has been noted that had Syracuse not broken its pact with Rome, it could have retained its autonomy and remained a vibrant polis for centuries, as Rome respected cities such as Marseille and Rhodes. However, Syracuse chose rebellion and its unpredictable consequences.)

=== Roman era ===
Carthage accepted the alliance with Syracuse. Hannibal, promising control over all Sicily in exchange for direct participation in the war against Rome, sent two generals to govern temporarily: Hippocrates and Epicydes. Their selection was deliberate, as both had Syracusan origins (their father, a soldier of Agathocles, had stayed in Africa), intended to ease acceptance of Carthaginian leadership.

Rome, aiming to wrest Syracuse from enemy forces, sent consul Marcus Claudius Marcellus, who led survivors of the Battle of Cannae, redeployed for this siege.

During the prolonged conflict, in 212 BC, a severe plague struck south of the city, decimating the Carthaginian army sent by Hannibal, leaving Syracuse without allied reinforcements. The Romans also suffered from the contagion, but Marcellus, retreating to an abandoned part of the polis, found shelter in empty houses, saving his army.

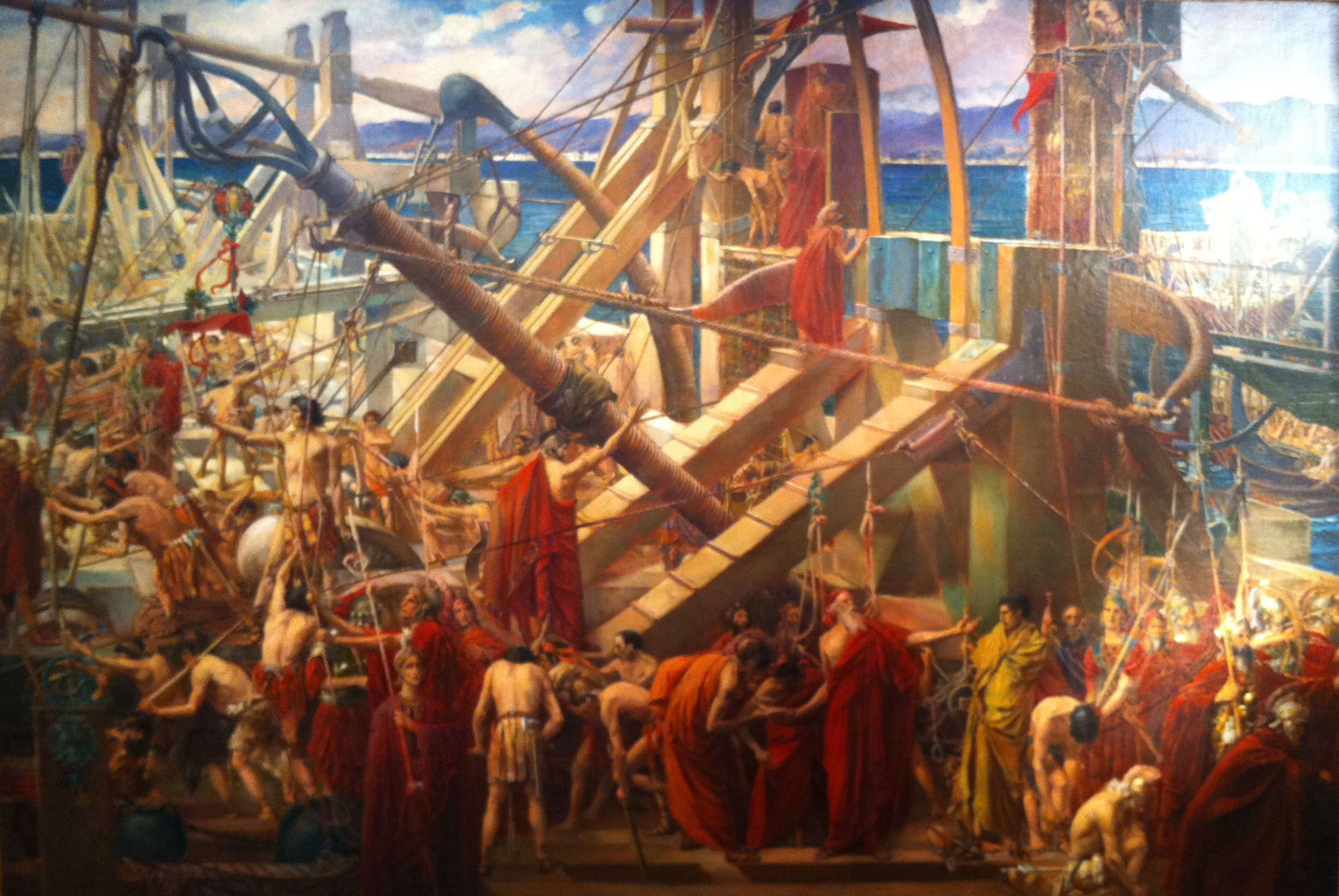
Archimedes directs Syracuse's defense from the walls (19th-century painting by Thomas Ralph Spence)

The assault continued, with Archimedes leading the defense, deploying an array of war machines that instilled such fear in the Romans that, as Plutarch wrote, they felt they were "not fighting men but waging war against gods."

Ultimately, the pentapolis fell due to betrayal. A Spanish mercenary, Merico, a commander ("Ispanus dux"), secretly conspired with Marcellus. Tasked with defending the Fountain of Arethusa, he opened Ortygia's gates at dawn, allowing Roman soldiers to overpower the defenders. The last district to fall was Acradina. The rest of the polis had already been lost, with Marcellus entering the Hexapylon and Ticha first. Archimedes was killed by the Romans, either by mistake or for prolonging Syracuse's resistance for over two years.

Marcellus prevented the city from being burned and ensured the Syracusans’ physical safety, but the city's most valuable treasures were relentlessly taken to Rome. The plundering of the pentapolis’ wealth was thorough. According to Livy, the booty was comparable to what would have been found in Carthage had it fallen.

By the end of the Second Punic War (in 201 BC), Syracuse had lost its independence. Ranked among Sicilian cities by their degree of freedom and Roman allegiance, the pentapolis was at the bottom, having been conquered by force, resulting in the complete loss of decision-making power. As a property of the Urbs under Roman law, it was classified as a civita censoria. Nevertheless, it was chosen as the seat of the praetor, capital of Roman Sicily, the first Roman province, demonstrating "what a noble task it was to rule foreign peoples."

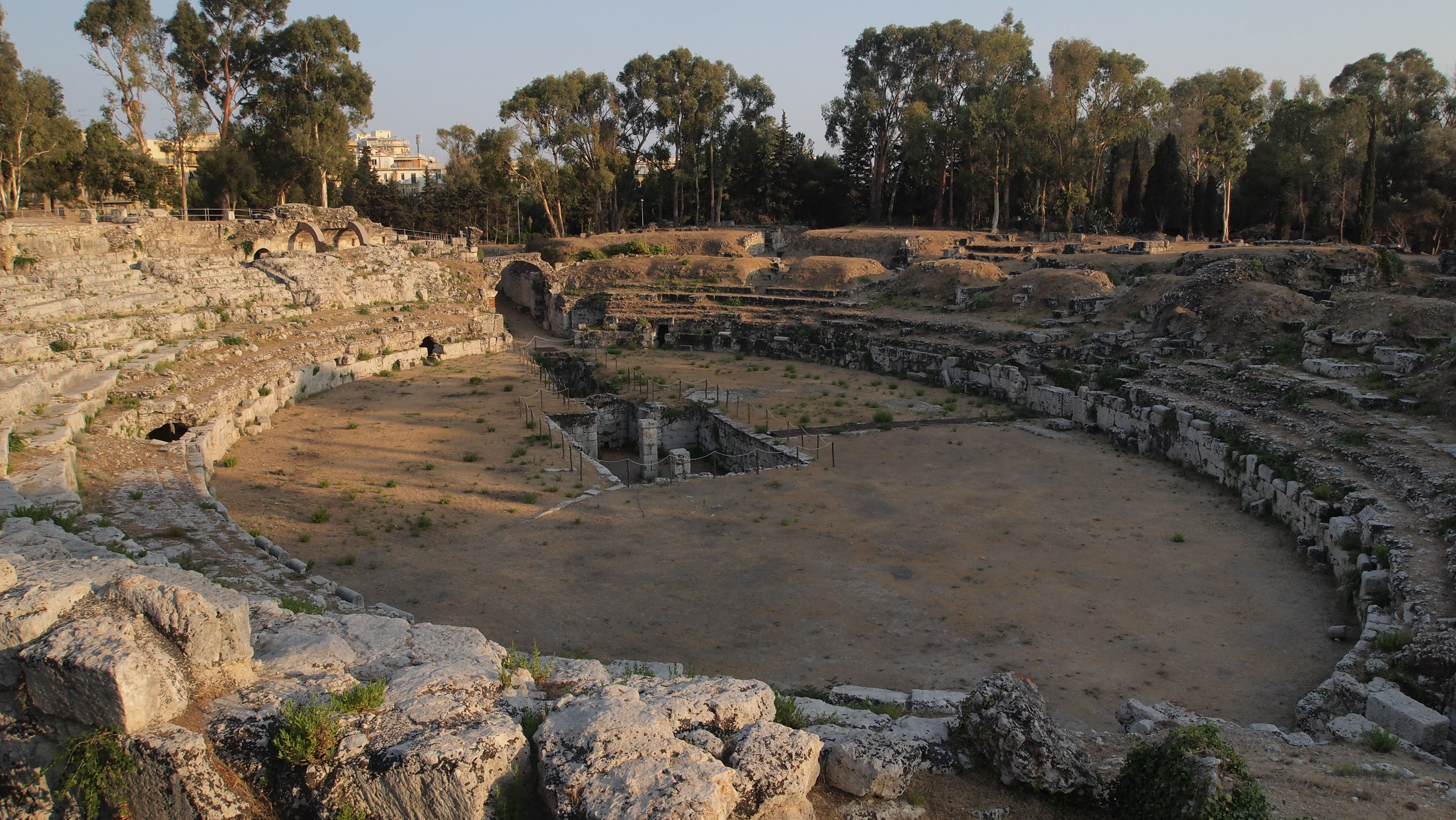
Remains of the Roman amphitheatre of Syracuse

Syracuse marked a turning point in Roman history. While Rome resolved to destroy Carthage definitively (famously reiterated by Cato the Elder’s "Carthago delenda est" until the Third Punic War razed it), Syracuse was treated differently, spared to show the world Rome's capacity beyond barbarity. (Note: Plutarch notes that before capturing the polis, Romans showed little mercy to conquered peoples: The Romans, until then regarded by other peoples as men of great valor and military skill, fearsome in battle, had not yet proven justice, kindness, or political virtue. It seems Marcellus was the first to demonstrate to the Greeks that the Romans excelled in these qualities. — Plutarch, Life of Marcellus, trans. Girolamo Pompei, 1833, p. 294.) Its culture survived, its statues adorned Rome, sparking Rome's love for Greek culture, conquering Greece while adopting its customs and religion. (Note: Cato the Elder, opposing a Hellenized Rome, called Syracusan statues "infected," likening them to a "dangerous enemy" in the city: Beware the evils the future holds. We tasted Greece and Asia’s delights; our hands seized kings’ treasures: masters of such wealth, we will soon be its slaves... By bringing Syracuse’s statues, Marcellus introduced dangerous enemies among us: I hear only those admiring Corinth and Athens’ marble and chisels, mocking our clay gods. — Cato the Elder in Livy, I, 34. Trans. in Cesare Cantù, Storia universale, vol. II, 1884, p. 492.)

In subsequent years, Syracuse followed the fates of the Roman Republic and later the Roman Empire. In 75 BC, Cicero visited to prosecute the praetor Verres, accused of plundering Sicily's remaining wealth. Cicero claimed to have found Archimedes’ tomb, nearly forgotten by the Syracusans.

Having most likely sided with Sextus Pompeius during the Roman civil war of 49 BC, Syracuse was severely punished by Emperor Augustus for this reason. In an effort to revive the city, Augustus repopulated it in 21 BC with a Roman colony, thereby promoting the spread of the Latin language within it (although the Greek language continued to predominate).

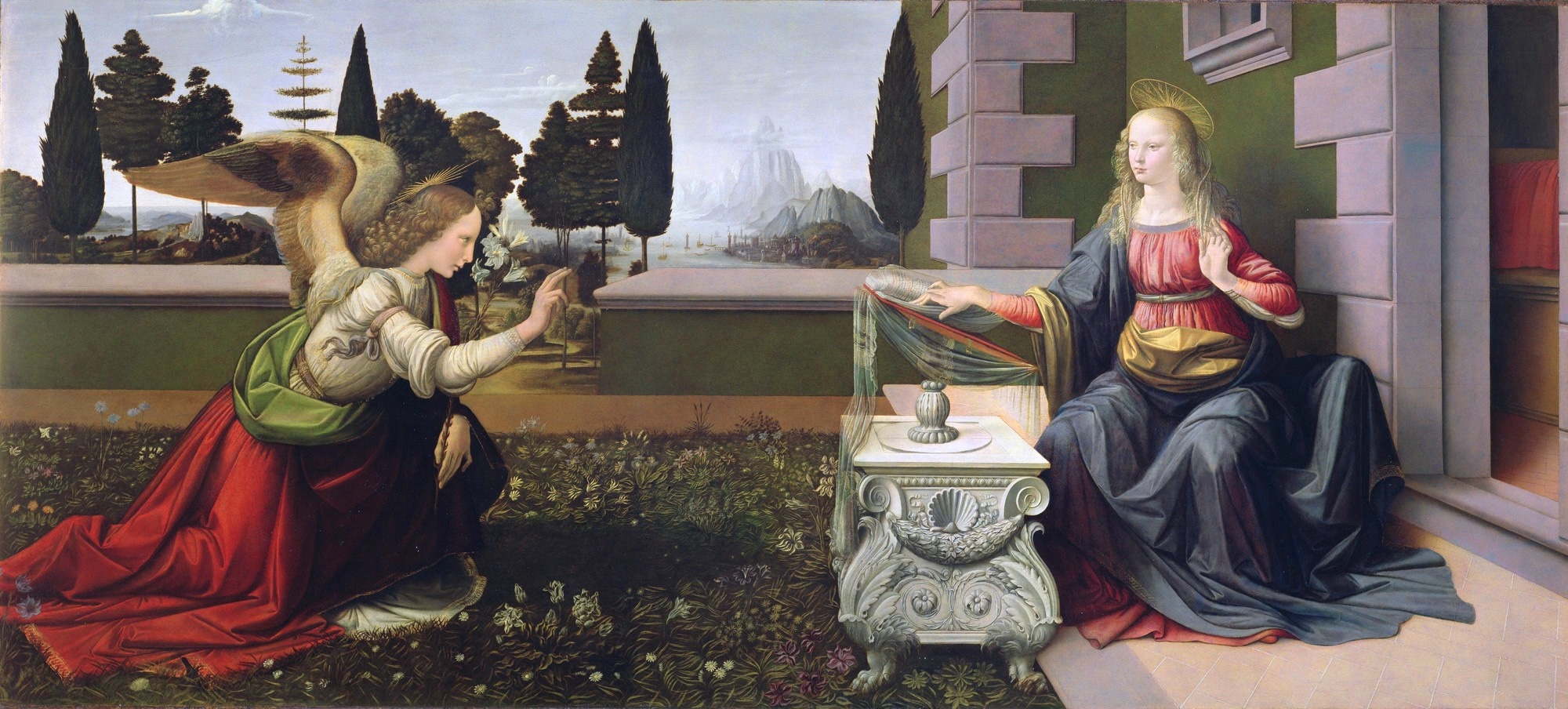
The Annunciation, one of the most significant moments in Christianity: the archangel Gabriel announces to the Virgin Mary the future birth of Christ (painting by Leonardo da Vinci, 14th century)

During the reign of Tiberius, who had the colossal and archaic bronze statue of Apollo Temenites removed from Syracuse (something neither Verres nor Marcellus had dared to do (Note: Despite being accused by Plutarch of having triumphantly brought to Rome, through the sacred statues of Syracuse, even “the gods themselves enslaved.” Girolamo Pompei, Lives of Illustrious Men by Plutarch, p. 295. Cf. Annals of Rome, 1838, p. 94.)), a religious upheaval occurred that would profoundly shape the future of Roman history and its provinces: in the eastern part of the Empire, in the Near East, in the year 33, Jesus of Nazareth was crucified; he claimed to be the Son of God, the reincarnation of the Holy Spirit (the Messiah of the Jewish religion). This event led to the birth of Christianity.

Disciples of Jesus (Yĕhošūa) began spreading his word (the logos) to the western part of the Empire, and according to tradition, it first reached Syracuse: in the year 39 or 40 Peter, one of the 12 apostles, sent Marcian, of Jewish origin, from Antioch (according to tradition, the Syriac church was the starting point for the earliest evangelization missions) to Syracuse, appointing him the first bishop of the future Aretusean church (however, the earliest written sources regarding his arrival are relatively late, dating to the 7th century).

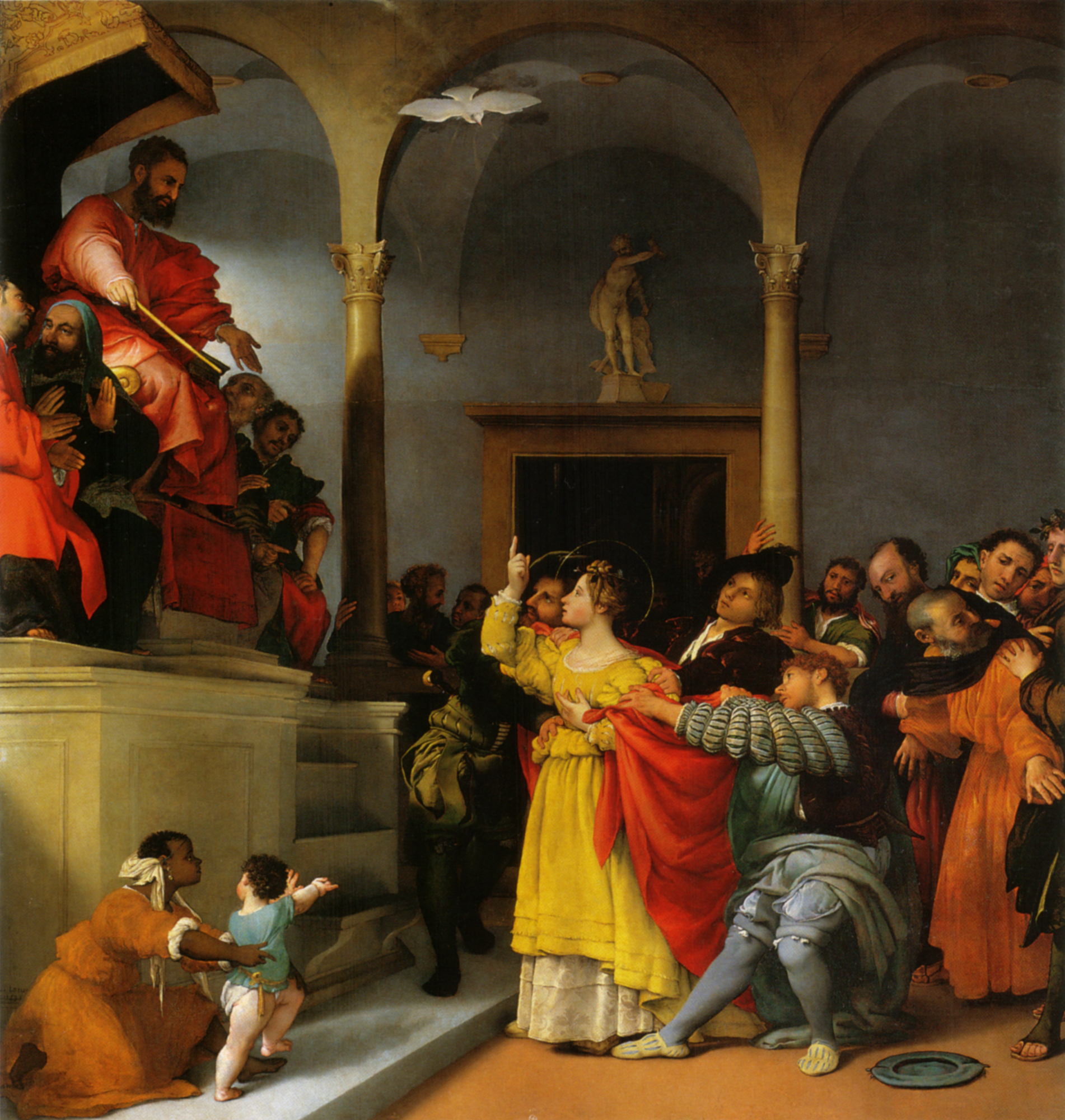
Saint Lucy defends her Christian beliefs before the Roman praetor (painting by Lorenzo Lotto, 15th century)

Since Peter was still in Antioch, Marcian, already in Sicily, is often referred to, though not officially (and presumably in contrast with the tradition that later asserted Peter's arrival in Rome around the same time, around 42), as the first bishop of the West. (Note: Martyred bishop of Syracuse, Italy, called "the First Bishop of the West". — Bunson, Our Sunday Visitor's Encyclopedia of Saints, 2003, p. 519. The same definition is given by scholars C. J. Stallman, The Past in Hagiographic Texts: S. Marcian of Syracuse, in G. W. Clarke, Reading the Past in Late Antiquity, Singapore 1990, pp. 347-365 and Hugo Buchthal, Art of the Mediterranean World: 100-1400 A. D., 1983, p. 61.) (Note: By virtue of this tradition, the nave of the Syracuse Cathedral bears the inscription of the apostolic brief that Pope Leo X, through his secretary, Cardinal Pietro Bembo, wrote on May 15, 1517, to the Spaniard Pietro Urries, appointed bishop of Syracuse: The church of Syracuse is the first daughter of Saint Peter and the second after the church of Antioch dedicated to Christ Ecclesia Syracusana, prima divi Petri filia et prima post Antiochenam Christo dicata — Pope Leo X, 1517)

The Acts of the Apostles (New Testament) state that in the year 61, the apostle Paul of Tarsus arrived in Syracuse in the company of Romans: he landed from Malta and stayed in Syracuse for three days, during which time he is believed to have preached the words of Christ. (Note: As early as the 4th century, John Chrysostom claimed to be certain that the apostle Paul had preached during his Syracusan stopover; later, a tradition emerged in which Paul was also active in the Hyblaean region. Syracuse is generally recognized as the center of irradiation for Christianity in Sicily, although the first official testimony of the existence of its church comes from a letter written by the church of Rome in 250/251. Cf. Giovanni Uggeri, p. 262 in Paul of Tarsus - Archaeology - History - Reception (edited by Luigi Padovese), 2009, p. 262; Journal of the History of the Church in Italy (edited by), vol. 53, ed. 1, 1999, p. 5; Franco Libero Belgiorno, Modica and Its Churches from the Origins of Christianity to Today, 1953.)

In the centuries following this event, a religious war broke out in the Roman Empire between the early Christian communities and the older Greco-Roman faith, now referred to as paganism: the Christians of Syracuse found refuge in the catacombs beneath the city (among the largest in the world, perhaps second only to those in Rome). Early on, under Nero, the first martyrs of the new religion emerged in Syracuse (it was Nero who initiated the Christian persecutions), but it was under Diocletian, at the end of the 3rd century, that this conflict reached its peak (Diocletianic Persecution): on December 13, 304, the martyrdom of Saint Lucy (the future patron saint of the city) took place.

Following the Jewish diaspora of the Roman era, caused by the Jewish–Roman wars, a large colony of Jewish citizens settled in Syracuse: they were the builders of the mikveh of Syracuse.

== The Germanic Era ==
The Barbarian Invasions ultimately led to the fall of the Western Roman Empire in the 4th century; Syracuse was one of the first imperial cities to experience the impact of these invasions: as early as 278/280, under Emperor Marcus Aurelius Probus, it was attacked and sacked by the Franks, who arrived from the Black Sea (Note: This information is reported only by Zosimus (Historia Nova, I, 71, 2), and it has been assumed that other ancient sources remained silent because the sacking of an important city such as Syracuse was seen as a disgraceful and unexpected event for the Roman military defense.) (this was a direct consequence of Marcus Aurelius Probus' struggles against the Germanic peoples, as by attacking them, he had relocated a large number of them from the North Sea to the Black Sea, ancient Pontus Euxinus, not expecting, however, that they would, in turn, attack the Sicilians). With the arrival of the Germanic Vandals, who began the conquest of Sicily around 440 AD, the city became part of the Germanic Vandal kingdom with its capital in Carthage. Subsequently, it became part of the kingdom of the Goths, who had previously conquered peninsular Italy.

== The Byzantine era ==
After being part of the domains of Odoacer and the Goths, Syracuse became part of the Eastern Roman Empire, better known as the Byzantine Empire: conquered in 535 by General Belisarius, in the name of Emperor Justinian I, it returned under Greek influence, and given its strongly Hellenic past, this also meant a return to the hegemonic role granted by its geopolitical position, serving as a bridge between the Mediterranean West and East. In this context, during the early decades of the new Arab–Byzantine wars, in 663, Emperor Constans II decided to move the capital of the Empire from Constantinople (ancient Byzantium) to Syracuse.

The reasons behind this decision remain shrouded in mystery to this day: it seems that he intended to reconquer the lost western domains from there or, more likely, Syracuse was the base from which to prepare to confront the Arabs, who, starting with the prophet Muhammad, the founder of Islam, had conquered many lands, reaching from Syria to Tripoli, Libya. It was, therefore, a struggle for dominance over the entire Mediterranean.

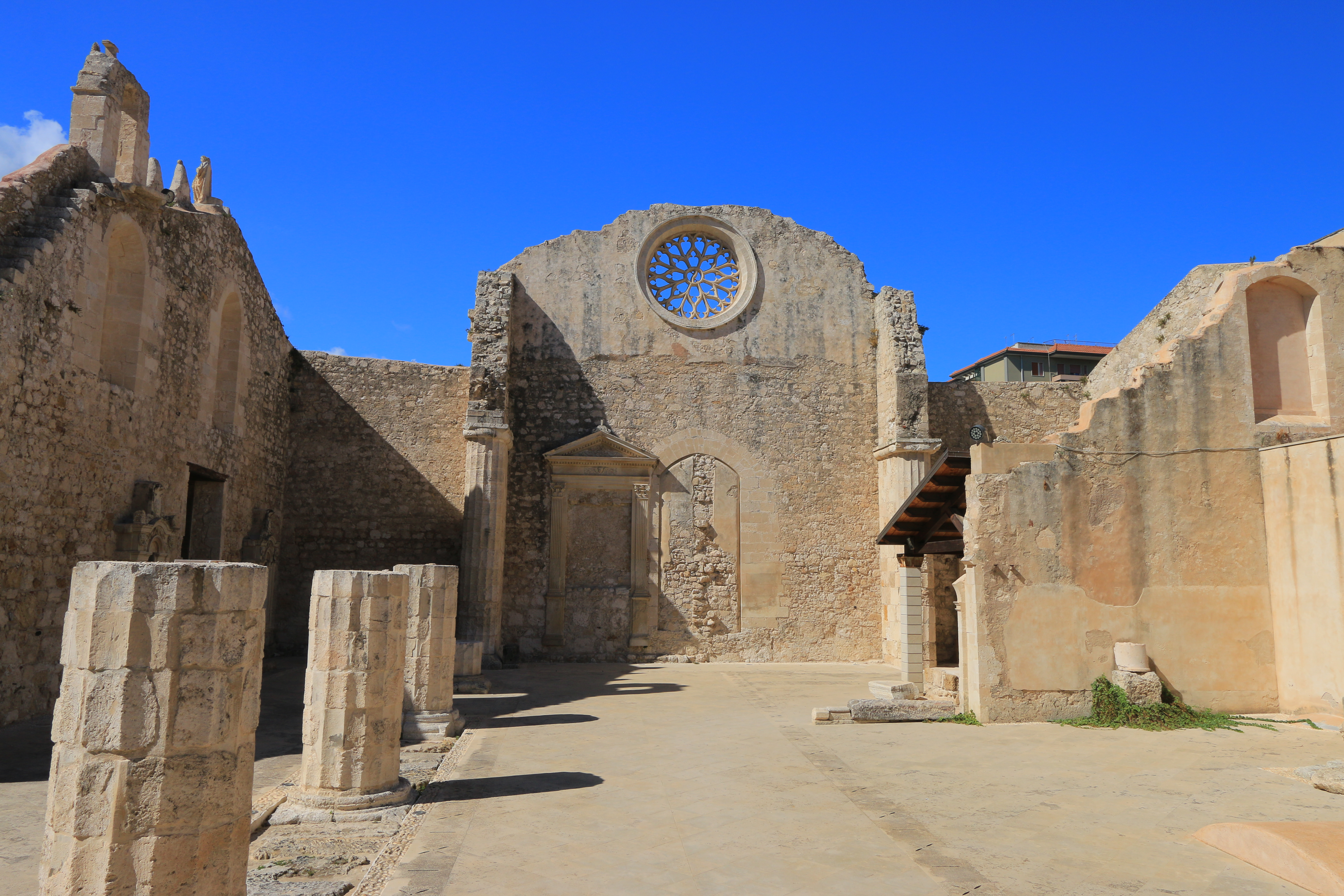
Remains of the interior of the Church of San Giovanni alle Catacombe: one of the oldest in Syracuse, dating back to the Byzantine era, it was later destroyed by a violent earthquake but in the 8th century was the scene of conflicts between Arabs and Greeks: the commander Ja'far ibn Muhammad set up camp there during the siege of 878

Whatever the reason, the transfer of central power to Sicilian soil did not gain the favor of Constantinople: the city on the Bosphorus initially refused to allow the imperial family to leave for reunification with Constans II, and when he was killed by Mezezius - who declared himself or was declared emperor - in 669, it sent its armies to Syracuse, deploying soldiers from various parts of the Empire. Constantine IV, the legitimate heir to the throne, came to reclaim the crown and restore the imperial seat to New Rome.

As Arab power grew around it, Syracuse was involved in the 8th century in religious disputes that arose between the Western and Eastern churches: at the onset of the division of the church between Catholic and Orthodox, an event known as the Great Schism (whose first spark is attributed to the Syracusan bishop Gregory Asbestas, who, on Christmas night, December 25, 858, consecrated Photios I of Constantinople as patriarch, leading to subsequent excommunications between pope and patriarch), all Sicilian churches were taken from the Supreme Pontiff and placed under the authority of the Patriarchate of Constantinople. In response, Pope Nicholas I claimed the appointment of the bishop of Syracuse, addressing the basileus Michael III, urging that the tradition established by the apostles not be betrayed. (Note: Cf. PAGI in Baron. ad ann. 730, n. 11.: Pope Nicholas I to Emperor Michael III of the East, September 25, 860; complete letter in Andrea Gallo, Ecclesiastical Code of Sicily, 1846, p. 5: [...] Among these and the aforementioned, we wish that the consecration of the Syracusan Archbishop be granted by our seat so that the tradition established by the apostles is in no way violated in our times [...] Inter ista, et superius dicta volumus ut consecratio Syracusano Archiepiscopo nostra a sede impendatur ut traditio ab apostolis instituta nullatenus nostris temporibus violetur)

Michael did not comply with the Roman request, but it seems that during this period, the Syracusan bishop declared himself autocephalous, meaning he recognized no ecclesiastical authority above his own ministry, neither papacy nor patriarchate.

Under a pretext - taking advantage of the internal struggles between the Sicilians and Constantinople - the Arabs initiated the Islamic conquest of Sicily: Euphemius of Messina, usurping imperial power in Sicily, sought allies for his cause and called the Arabs to the island. After an initial collaboration, the Muslims gained the upper hand over Euphemius.

== The Arab era ==
The Arab conquest began in 827, but clashes had already started in previous centuries; among these, the most severe for Syracuse was in 669 (given the year, some scholars have attributed responsibility to Mezezius, though without certainty): with 200 ships, the Syrian Abdallah ibn Qais (ʿAbd-Allāh-ibn-Kais), a military officer of the Umayyad Caliphate - based in Damascus, Syria, where the first Sicilian prisoners were taken in 662 -, attacked the Sicilian capital from Alexandria, managing to sack it; he left after a month. (Note: The Arab chronicler from Baghdad, Beladori (Ahmed-ibn-Iahīa), recounts that during the occupation, a large number of idols made of precious metals and gems were found in Syracuse (Christian sources counter that these idols were nothing but loot plundered by Constans in Italy before arriving in the Aretusean city and, according to some, were actually Christian religious images). The Syrian caliph Muʿāwiya ibn Abī Sufyān sent them to India, where, being Hindu, idolatry was permitted: he hoped to gain great profit but was instead harshly criticized by Muslims, scandalized that a pontiff, their caliph, would profit from the goods of infidels.)

A significant turning point had occurred the previous year, in 668: Musa ibn Nusayr, governor of al-Andalus (Islamic Spain) and Ifriqiya, seized Tunisia, gaining access to the direct navigation route to Sicily that once belonged to Carthage (whose renewed existence was definitively crushed by the Syrian caliphate in that same 668). From then on, raids on the island became more frequent.

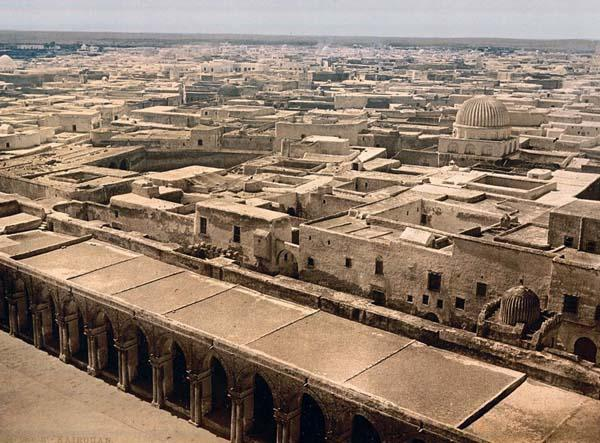
Kairouan, in Tunisia, was the capital of the Abbasid Aghlabids; the conquerors of Sicily (where, moreover, Syracusan prisoners were sent after 878)

Musa ibn Nusayr launched in 704 (corresponding to the year 85 of the Islamic calendar) a new type of war in the Mediterranean; a “holy war” and attacked western Sicily (probably the influential Lilybaeum); in 705 (year 86 of the Islamic calendar), he ordered an attack on Syracuse, which suffered another sack. In 740, Syracuse became a tributary of the Arabs (it was necessary to pay a tribute in money to lift the siege imposed on it (Note: This can be considered the first attempt at invasion: in those circumstances, the Arabs (who had just conquered the island of Pantelleria), arriving again from Tunisia, were under the command of Habib ibn Abi Ubaida al-Fihri; part of the Quraysh family, Arabs from the Islamic holy city of Mecca, founders of Kairouan. They settled for the money and left Syracuse in peace. Cf. Michele Amari, History of the Muslims of Sicily, 1854, p. 124; Paolo Rossi, History of Italy, from 476 to 1870: 476-1500, 1960, p. 148.)).

These ongoing tensions led to the landing at Mazara in 827: the Mesopotamian general Asad ibn al-Furat fought in the name of the Aghlabid emirate, a dynasty that had gained autonomy in North Africa but remained part of the Abbasid Caliphate (Mesopotamian, related to Muhammad). After conquering Lilibeo and renaming it Marsala, Asad directed his forces straight toward the eastern part of the island, aiming to capture Syracuse.

In this first siege, the attackers lacked sufficient manpower; their homeland was expected to send reinforcements. However, Syracuse itself was poorly defended: Constantinople could not provide aid, as it was engaged in countering an invasion of the Empire from the Greek front, but it sent allies—soldiers from the Republic of Venice under the command of Doge Giustiniano Participazio—who assisted the Syracusans in holding out. The decisive factor in the prolonged siege was a severe epidemic that broke out in the Arab camp, which in 828 claimed the life of the commander Asad.

Weakened, the Arabs were overwhelmed by the arrival of additional Italian reinforcements: the ships of Boniface II, attacking their domains in Tunisia, managed to divert the Caliphate's attention from the siege. With Syracuse relieved, the Arabs entrenched themselves at Mineo (on the Catanian side of the Hyblaean Mountains), but shortly afterward, another epidemic—or possibly the same one, still lingering—decimated them, forcing them to abandon their plans to conquer eastern Sicily. (Note: The Arabist historian Michele Amari describes their flight from the Aretusean city as follows: [...] No chronicler recorded the horrific losses that the army, plagued by an epidemic, inevitably suffered—shuttled from the camp onto boats, and from boats to land, hurriedly driven through rugged and mountainous paths, without supplies or beasts to carry the sick. Ibn-Khal-dûn alone hints at such afflictions, stating that the survivors longed only for death. — Michele Amari, Storia dei Musulmani di Sicilia, vol. 1, 1854, p. 278.)

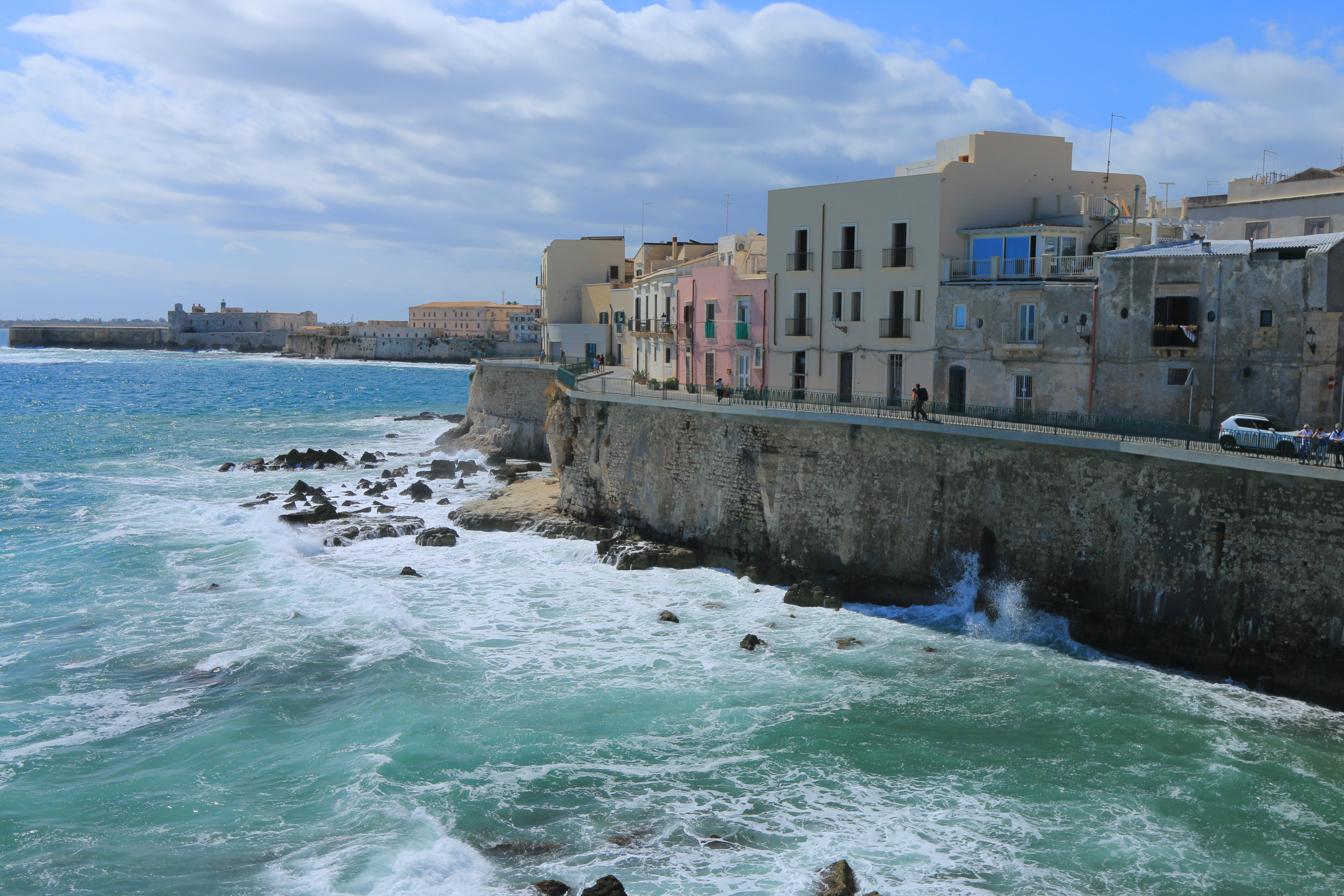
The Island of Ortygia (eastern side): after the Arab conquest and until the dawn of the modern era, it remained the only inhabited part of an otherwise entirely abandoned Syracuse

A half-century passed before the Arabs turned their attention back to the Sicilian capital (in the meantime, they had conquered nearly the entire island). In 878, they laid siege to Syracuse again, led by the governor of Palermo, Jafar ibn Muhammad (though organized by the Aghlabid emirate in Tunis, from whose shores an army was dispatched to block Syracuse's access to the sea).

The siege lasted nine months, during which the population, with the port blockaded and no viable land routes, was reduced to starvation within the city walls. This time, no external aid arrived, (Note: The Byzantine emperor Basil I the Macedonian did not send reinforcements because he and his forces were preoccupied with the construction of the Nea Ekklesia, dedicated to the Archangel Michael (or Gabriel, according to some sources). The construction was deemed so critical by the emperor that ancient Byzantine sources linked it to the fall of Syracuse: [...] the renowned Νέα ὲκκλησία, whose construction, according to Byzantine chronicles, cost the Empire the loss of Syracuse. — Cited in Rivista di studi bizantini e neoellenici, vol. 40, 2004, p. 39. At one point, Basil decided to redirect an imperial fleet—initially aimed at Syria—toward Syracuse, placing it under the command of Admiral Adrian. However, the fleet did not reach Sicily due to strong contrary winds, and Adrian halted in Greece. At Monemvasía, he reportedly received news of Syracuse's fall from demons (or sprites), a report later confirmed by the arrival of Syracusan survivors at his ships.) yet it was not starvation-induced surrender but the collapse of the walls, relentlessly bombarded day and night, that marked the end of the fierce resistance.

The ancient city fell on Wednesday, 21 May 878 (vigesima prima Maii mensis die Mercurii civitas adversariis tradita est). Given the extreme tenacity encountered in capturing it (after the first breach in the walls, hand-to-hand combat ensued, continuing for the final twenty days of the siege), the city was not spared a massacre: the Arabs indiscriminately slaughtered around 5,000 citizens, imprisoned the remaining population, and subjected the military garrison to lynching, with the victims later sacrificed outside the walls. The historian Ibn al-Athir commented on the Syracuse massacre, noting that "few, very few survived".

Ali Ibn al-Athir states that the fighters departed at the start of the Islamic month of Dhu al-Qa'da (August), with the looting lasting 60 days. The plunder taken from the city was the most substantial ever acquired by the Arabs from a Christian city ("never was such rich booty taken from another Christian metropolis").

After the first month of fires and destruction, some inhabitants, reduced to slavery, were taken away and imprisoned in Palermo, while others were brought to the Aghlabid capital, Kairouan. Although historian Michele Amari deduces from his studies that Syracuse was left as "a labyrinth of ruins, without a living soul", the author of the Annali musulmani, Giovanni Battista Rampoldi, disagrees, asserting that in 886, around 4,000 Syracusans, imprisoned in their own city for years, were ransomed (and an equal number were ransomed in Kairouan). Amari considers the figure of 8,000 ransomed individuals too high, given the Mesopotamian historian's claim that very few survived.

The Chronicle of Cambridge states that in the year 263 (corresponding to 885), an unknown individual (scholars have not reached a consensus on their identity or role) arrived in Palermo, ransomed Syracuse's prisoners—without specifying their number—and either freed them or took them away (depending on interpretations of the original text).

Despite being fully integrated into the Islamic Empire, Constantinople never formally accepted the dissolution of the Syracusan church, continuing to list it among the Christian sees of the Eastern Roman Empire.

== Medieval period ==
Possessions in southern Italy and North Africa in 1154

=== From the arrival of the Normans to the Aragonese ===
The Aghlabids were soon succeeded by the Fatimids, whose caliphate controlled Sicily from Egypt, while granting it formal autonomy through the Kalbids (who established the Emirate of Sicily at the dawn of the second millennium). Their rule over the island was marked by internal strife, which encouraged the Byzantines to attempt a reconquest: in 1040, the strategos George Maniakes briefly recaptured Syracuse from the Arabs, but discord within his army rendered the conquest futile, and the Aretusean city returned to the control of the emirs.

Maniakes’ army consisted largely of Vikings, hailing from both Normandy and Scandinavia. The Norman faction developed the idea of breaking away from the Greeks of Constantinople to conquer Sicily independently. The opportunity arose through the emir of Syracuse, the qaid Ibn al-Thumna, who, having taken control of the Sicilian emirate, forged an anti-Arab alliance with the Normans in 1061. As with the Arabs, Syracuse was among the last cities to fall to the new rulers: in May 1086, the last emir of Sicily, Benavert (whose Arabic name was Ibn ‘Abbād), fought a nocturnal naval battle in the Great Harbour against the Norman army of Roger I of Sicily and was defeated. In October of the same year, after five months of siege, the city surrendered.

The Syracusan poet Ibn Hamdis dedicated the following verses to the final fall of Sicily, and Syracuse, into Norman hands:

Do (our people) still inhabit a fortress in Castrogiovanni, where the trace of Islam has now been erased? Oh wonder, the demons (infidels) have made their home among the fiery constellations of the zodiac. And Syracuse has become their steadfast abode [...]

In other verses, Ibn Hamdis is even more critical of Sicily's return to Christianity, accusing the Normans of destroying mosques; in Syracuse specifically, the last mosque to resist was the Apollonion (the ancient Ortygian temple of Apollo; surviving Arabic inscriptions on its Greek walls still recall that period).

The Syracusan area—known in the Arab period as the Val di Noto—had been heavily Arabized, which led the new rulers to take drastic measures, more so than elsewhere, to restore it, as far as possible, to its pre-Islamic state. (Note: The Arabs divided Sicily into three valleys: the western Val di Mazara (their most closely aligned territory, initially colonized by the Phoenicians of Carthage), where their capital, Palermo, stood; the northern Val Demone, where their influence was minimal, allowing inhabitants considerable freedom to maintain Greek customs (this valley became a refuge for Christians); and the eastern Val di Noto, where Syracuse, having dominated nearly the entire island in past millennia and still its official capital, was granted less freedom than the Greeks and Latins of Val Demone.)

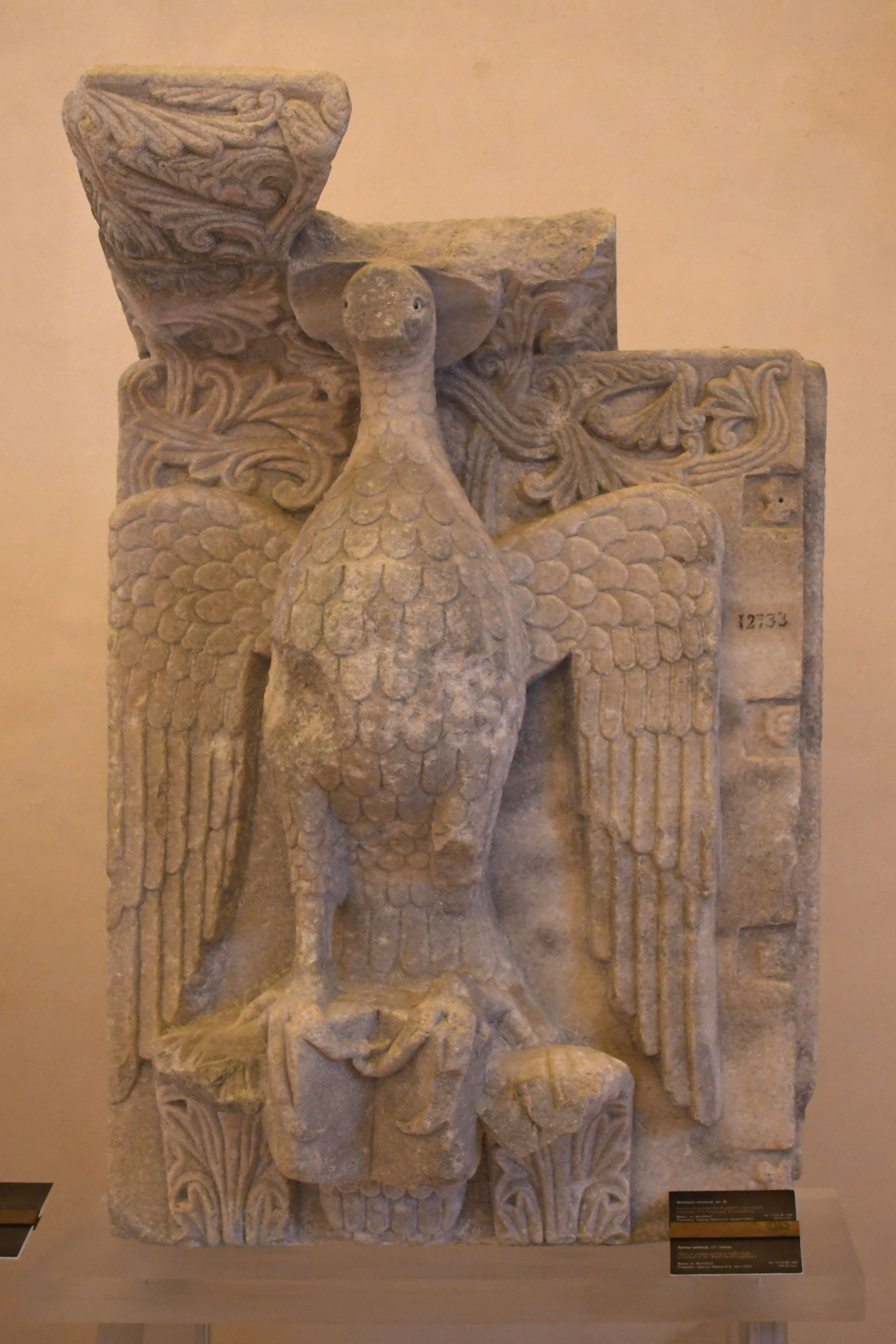
Remains of a Norman-made pulpit from the church of San Giovanni alle catacombe, depicting the eagle, symbol of John the Evangelist (Bellomo Palace Regional Gallery, 11th century)

In 1127, Syracuse endured its final violent Arab assault: in retaliation against Roger II, who was conquering neighboring African territories, they invaded the port and attacked the walls; part of the population managed to take refuge in the Hyblaean Mountains, while others were massacred, and the city was once again set ablaze and looted. Historians attribute to this final siege the Norman decision to ally with the popes and officially participate in the Crusades.

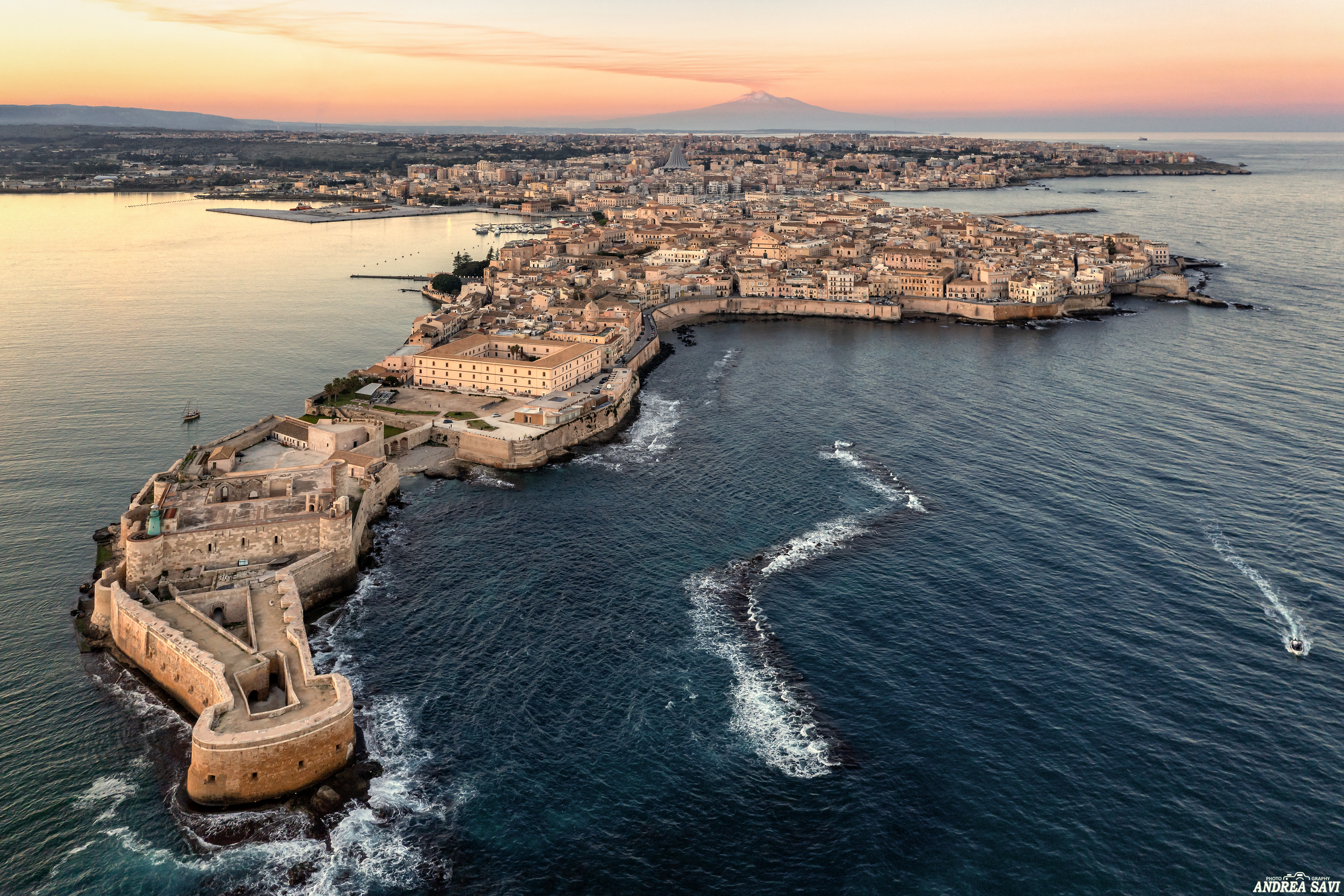
The island of Ortygia seen from the tip of Castello Maniace, a work of the Swabian period (in the background, the Hyblaean Mountains and Mount Etna)

Having become a Norman stronghold for the Christianization of the island, its archbishop in 1198 (the Syracusan church had been restored by the Normans in 1093) was appointed by Pope Innocent III as the "first commissioner of the Crusade", tasked with collecting Sicilian funds for the battles being fought in the Near East.

After a brief period as a county governed by its own count within the County of Sicily, Syracuse found itself at the center of a territorial dispute between the German Hohenstaufen—the Swabian imperial house to which Frederick I Barbarossa, Holy Roman Emperor, belonged, claiming dynastic rights over the island—and the maritime republics of Genoa and Pisa.

The Tuscans were already in Syracuse when the Ligurians arrived, asserting their feudal right to take possession of the Aretusean city, as it had been promised to them by the German emperor (in exchange, Genoa had aided the Hohenstaufen in reaching Sicily). The Pisans, however, did not yield easily, fighting to prevent the Syracusans from falling under Ligurian or German control.

Scholars note that the population, not aligning with any faction but passively observing events, must have been in dire conditions. Ultimately, Genoa prevailed over Pisa, and despite the Hohenstaufen's reluctance to honor their promise, Syracuse was governed as a Genoese fief for fifteen years. It became part of the Kingdom of Sicily when Barbarossa's grandson, Frederick II of Hohenstaufen, claimed it in 1221 (this caused tension between the Genoese and Germans).

In 1232, Frederick II began the construction of Castello Maniace and founded the city of Augusta on the northern border (which played a significant geopolitical role in Syracuse's subsequent history, filling the territorial void left by the ruins of Megara Hyblaea). In 1234, he bestowed upon the Aretusean city the epithet "urbs fidelissima" (most faithful city), which distinguished its representatives in the Sicilian Parliament even into modern times.

The union of the German Holy Roman Empire crown with that of Sicily was not well-received, (Note: The Norman historian Hugo Falcandus in his Liber De Regno Sicilie (12th century), referring to a potential Syracuse under the German crown, described it thus: Under the Germans, Sicily would be nothing but a wretched province [...] I can already see it invaded by those hordes, driven by fury to ravage with terror, slaughter, pillage, and lust, enslaving the nobility of the Corinthians who anciently nested in Sicily, once beautiful with so many philosophers and poets, and for whom the yoke of ancient tyrants would have been less burdensome. Woe to you, Arethusa, reduced to such misery, that while you once tuned the songs of poets, now you hear the drunken brawls of German quarrels and serve their depravities! — Hugo Falcandus in Cesare Cantù, Storia degli italiani, vol. 3, 1854, p. 470, n. 13.) which is why, when Frederick II unified them under his son Conrad IV of Germany, a succession struggle erupted: in 1263, Pope Urban IV, of French origin, offered the Sicilian crown to Charles I of Anjou, brother of Louis IX of France, despite the legitimate king of the Kingdom being Manfred of Hohenstaufen. Charles I of Anjou prevailed. With the Palermo revolt against the French, known as the Sicilian Vespers (1282), the island came under the influence of the Spanish through the Aragonese dynasty. Ninety years of wars followed, known as the War of the Sicilian Vespers, between the French and Aragonese, culminating in 1372 with the political separation of the island from the rest of the peninsula: the French retained the title of kings of Sicily for southern Italy (Kingdom of Naples), while the Aragonese became sovereigns of the Kingdom of Trinacria.

Following the establishment of the Queen's Chamber (based in Castello Maniace) by Frederick of Aragon, as a gift to his queen consort Eleanor of Anjou in 1302, Syracuse experienced a period of revival and vibrancy (which had already begun under Frederick II of Hohenstaufen). The Chamber, governed solely by Sicilian queens, granted significant autonomy, making Syracuse independent from the social dynamics of the rest of the island. Historians describe it as a state within a state (the queen governed it, but owed allegiance to the king).

== Modern period ==
=== The Spanish Empire ===
The last queen of Syracuse was Germaine of Foix (Infanta of Navarre, niece of Louis XII), wife of Ferdinand II of Aragon, who unified the Sicilian crown with that of Aragon, marking the start of the Sicilian viceroyalty (the island was henceforth governed not by a physically present sovereign but by a high representative). When the Spanish king died, Charles V of Habsburg ascended to power. As Germaine's grandson and the new king of Sicily, he had the authority to abolish the centuries-old Syracusan Chamber; he did so in 1536, following repeated requests from the Syracusans, who were in turn prompted by other Chamber territories—especially Lentini—dissatisfied with that political regime.

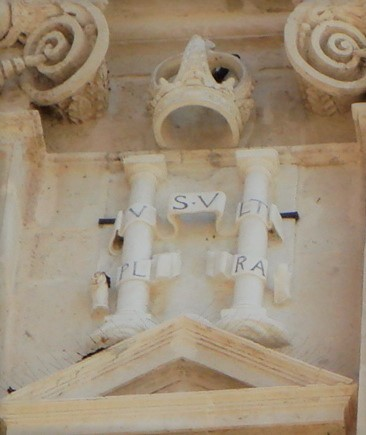
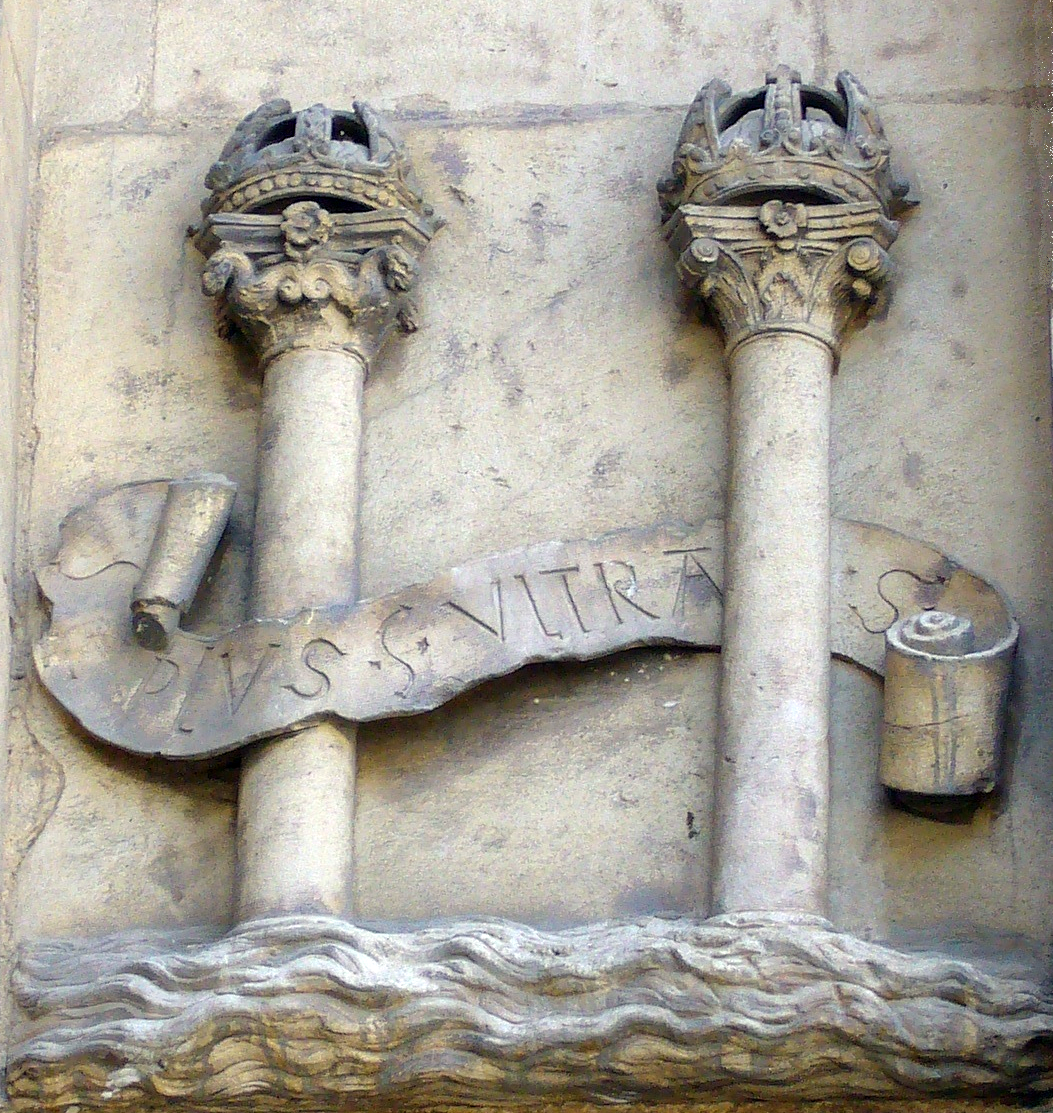
The Pillars of Hercules and Charles V’s motto "Plus Ultra" depicted in Syracuse (left) as in Seville (right); the emperor used this motto to challenge the myth of Hercules, which claimed nothing existed beyond his pillars: "Non plus ultra"; this is linked to the discovery of the New World.

Syracuse in the 16th century became a city controlled by the crown, and its representatives rejoined the Sicilian parliament. It was immediately reintegrated among the island's main parliamentary cities but lost many of its ancient privileges.

Charles V of Habsburg significantly shaped the modern era of the Aretusean city: he ensured it was heavily fortified to counterattacks from the Ottoman Empire. His military works were frequent and substantial; the most significant was the physical separation of the island of Ortygia from the mainland (restoring its original state, undoing the artificial connection made by the Greeks upon their arrival), surrounding it with deep and wide moats.

As ruler of the vast Spanish Empire and emperor of the Holy Roman Empire, Charles V made Syracuse (known in contemporary chronicles as "Zaragoza de Sicilia", to distinguish it in Spanish from Aragonese Zaragoza) a bulwark for defending Christian lands; he considered it the gateway to his realm from the Levant, now dominated by the Turks.

The domains of the Spanish Empire across the globe during its existence; Sicily was part of it from the 15th century to the 17th century

The fortification works for the prolonged Ottoman-Habsburg wars required the sacrifice of ancient Greek-Roman monuments, almost entirely stripped of their colossal stones.

In 1529, the Knights Hospitaller arrived in Syracuse intending to settle there (they were warmly received). Having lost their Aegean island following the siege by the Turks of Suleiman the Magnificent, they sought a new seat for the Order. Syracuse, due to its strategic position facing the East, was their choice, but Charles V refused to detach it from the rest of Sicily for the Hospitallers, denying their request. Instead, he granted the Order perpetual enfeoffment of the islands of Malta and Gozo (thus, the Maltese archipelago was permanently detached from the Sicilian viceroyalty), and they took the name Knights of Malta.

The 16th century and 17th century were marked for the inhabitants of eastern Sicily by a series of natural calamities: earthquakes, volcanic eruptions, epidemics, and famines, which decimated the population. Among these, the most devastating and significant for the Syracusans were:

- The plague epidemic of 1500 and 1501, during which 10,000 Aretusean citizens died.
- In 1522 and 1523, another plague epidemic, coupled with persistent drought and famine, led inhabitants to await, in vain, the end of the world.
- The Val di Noto earthquake of 1542 nearly submerged the fortress-city and stalled its demographic growth for a long time.
- The violent flood of 1558, which caused the rivers of the Hyblaean Mountains to overflow, destroying all of Syracuse's mills and sparking a centuries-long dispute over water and flour with the feudal lords of Sortino, who controlled the Hyblaean waters of Pantalica.
- In 1646, a severe famine struck the city, which in May held a procession invoking the divine intervention of Saint Lucy. On this occasion, the belief in the saint's miracle emerged, as ships laden with grain arrived.
- Preceded by the most violent historical eruption of Etna in 1669, a food shortage in 1672 killed 9,000 Syracusan citizens; 1672 was remembered in Aretusean chronicles as the "malannata grande", the terrible year.
- The Val di Noto earthquake of 1693 razed many towns in the Val di Noto; the city suffered tsunami waves and had about 5,000 victims. However, the 1542 earthquake was more destructive for Syracuse; the 1693 event marked the architectural rebirth of the area through reconstruction in the Sicilian Baroque style.

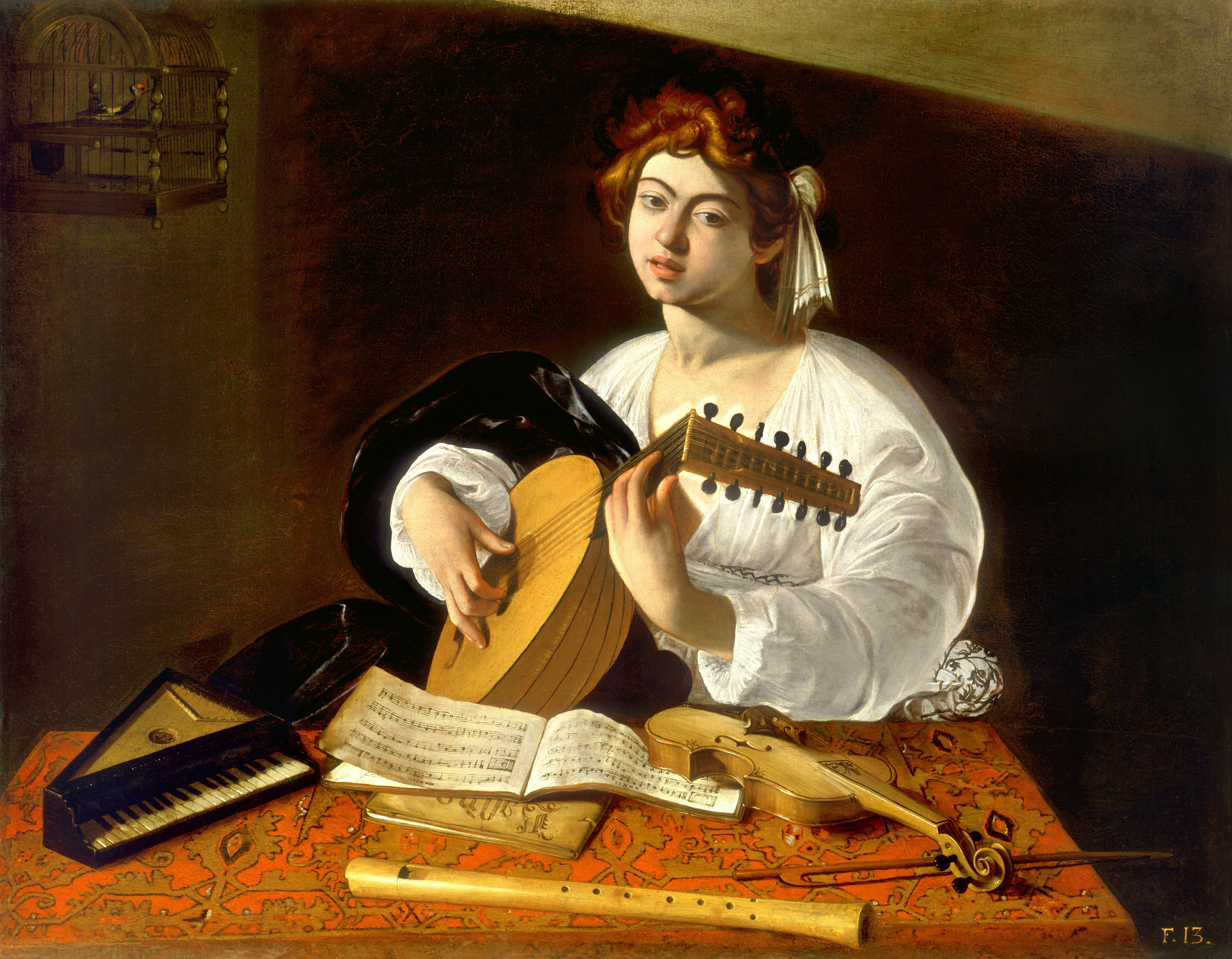
Painting by Caravaggio: The Lute Player; the model is the Syracusan Mario Minniti, who gave refuge to the Milanese painter when he arrived in Sicily in 1608, fleeing from the Knights of Malta

In 1608, Caravaggio stayed in the city; he arrived as a fugitive, in conflict with the Knights of Malta, seeking refuge with the Syracusan Mario Minniti, his confidant and model in many paintings (himself a prolific painter). During his stay, guided by Vincenzo Mirabella, a learned citizen, he named Syracuse's most famous cave: the Ear of Dionysius. Commissioned by the Syracusan Senate to create a sacred artwork for the city, he painted the Burial of Saint Lucy. He left Syracuse after a year, in 1609.

From 1674 to 1678, Syracuse and the Hyblaean area were involved in the Franco-Dutch War, contested between France, Spain, and the Netherlands: Messina, vying for the title of capital with Palermo, rebelled against the young sovereign Charles II of Spain and allied with the soldiers of the Sun King Louis XIV, becoming their military base for conquest operations (in exchange, they were promised to become the capital of a French Sicily). The military operations took place almost entirely in the Syracusan area, as the Sun King intended to first conquer the Aretusean area—the most fortified in Sicily—believing the rest of the island would follow.

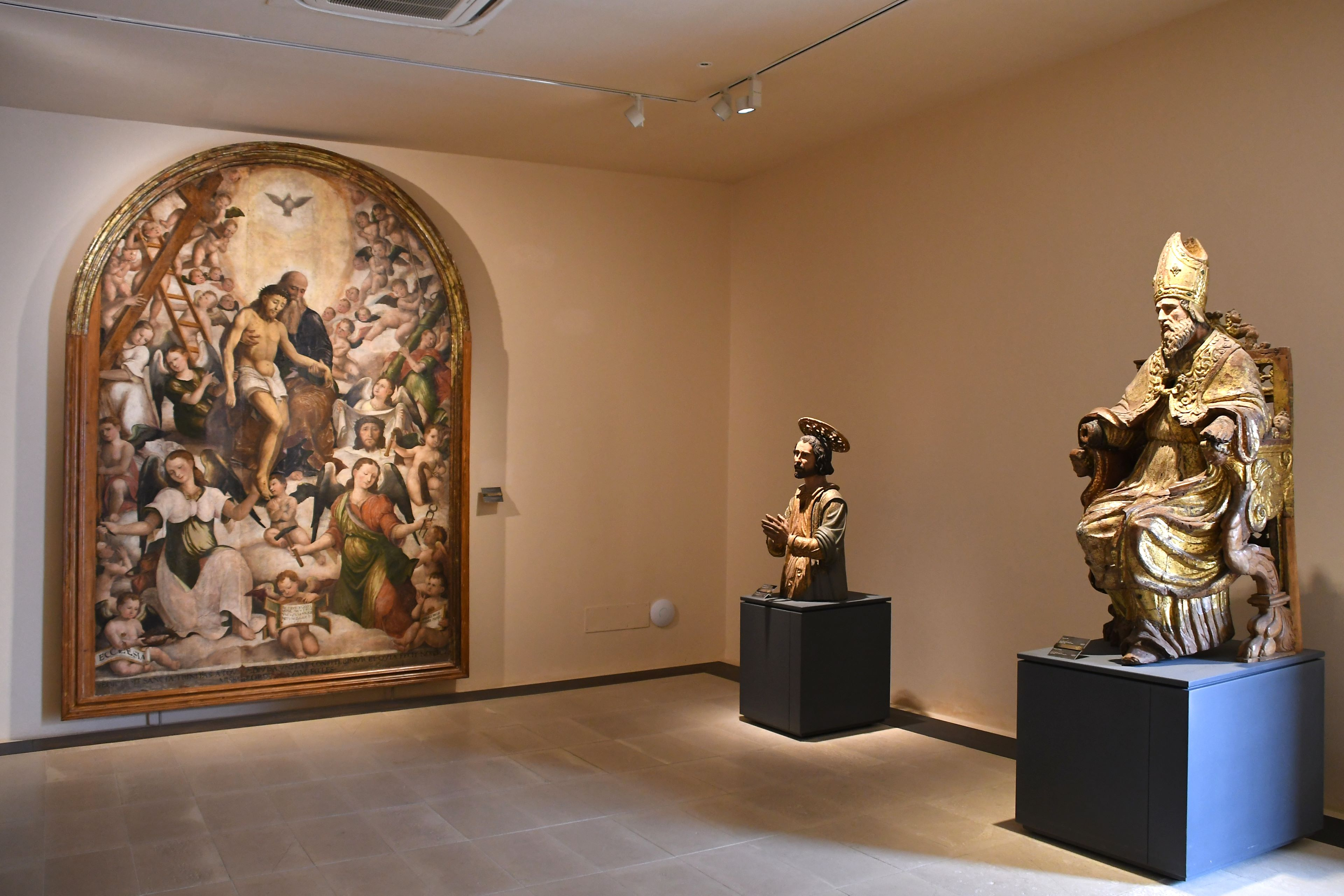
Sacred art of Spanish Syracuse: the canvas depicts the Deposition of Jesus from the Cross, a bust of Saint Regulus, and a statue of Saint Blaise (unknown artists of the 17th century, Bellomo Palace Regional Gallery, Ortygia Island)

The French succeeded in conquering Augusta but not Syracuse, which witnessed the death of the Dutch admiral Michiel de Ruyter within its walls during the Battle of Augusta, where the French army triumphed.

Wearied by the resistance of the Hyblaean inhabitants, who did not yield to his troops’ advance, and by rumors spreading in European courts about his Sicilian war, the Sun King signed the peace with Spain, abandoning Sicily and Messina to their fate. The following year, 1679, Spain, concerned about further Sicilian rebellions despite Syracuse and its territory demonstrating ample loyalty, declared the city a "military stronghold".

With the War of the Spanish Succession, the Sicilian crown was contested between the last Habsburgs of Spain and the French Bourbon dynasty: the Archduke of Austria Charles VI refused the crown of the Americas (Reinos de Indias) and Spain unless it included Sicily, which, according to the European powers’ division of the Spanish Empire, was to go to Philip V of Spain, grandson of the Sun King.

The war's various phases led Philip V of Spain to become king of Spain and the Americas, while the Archduke of Austria was crowned king of Sicily. However, the new Spanish king did not peacefully relinquish the Mediterranean island: in 1718, using American financial resources, the divided Spanish Empire attempted to reintegrate Sicily into its domains, invading it in violation of the Treaty of Utrecht, which had assigned the island to the House of Savoy. In a phase preceding the arrival of the German Habsburgs, Syracuse was the last Piedmontese stronghold: there, the viceroy Annibale Maffei entrenched himself with his soldiers to resist the Spanish forces.

Supported by Great Britain, the Spanish Navy suffered a severe defeat at the hands of the Royal Navy (Battle of Cape Passaro) in the waters of Syracuse, Avola, and Pachino, depriving the Spanish Army of naval support for Sicilian operations.

Despite Spain's ultimate defeat (Treaty of The Hague), neither the Savoy nor the Germans secured the Sicilian crown durably; it went to the Bourbon dynasty, with the prohibition of uniting the Franco-Spanish domains with those of Italy (Austria, allied with Russia and Prussia during the War of the Polish Succession, antagonized Louis XV, who supported a relative for the Polish throne, costing the Habsburgs the crowns of the Italian kingdoms, as France allied with Spain and Great Britain).

=== The Bourbon period ===
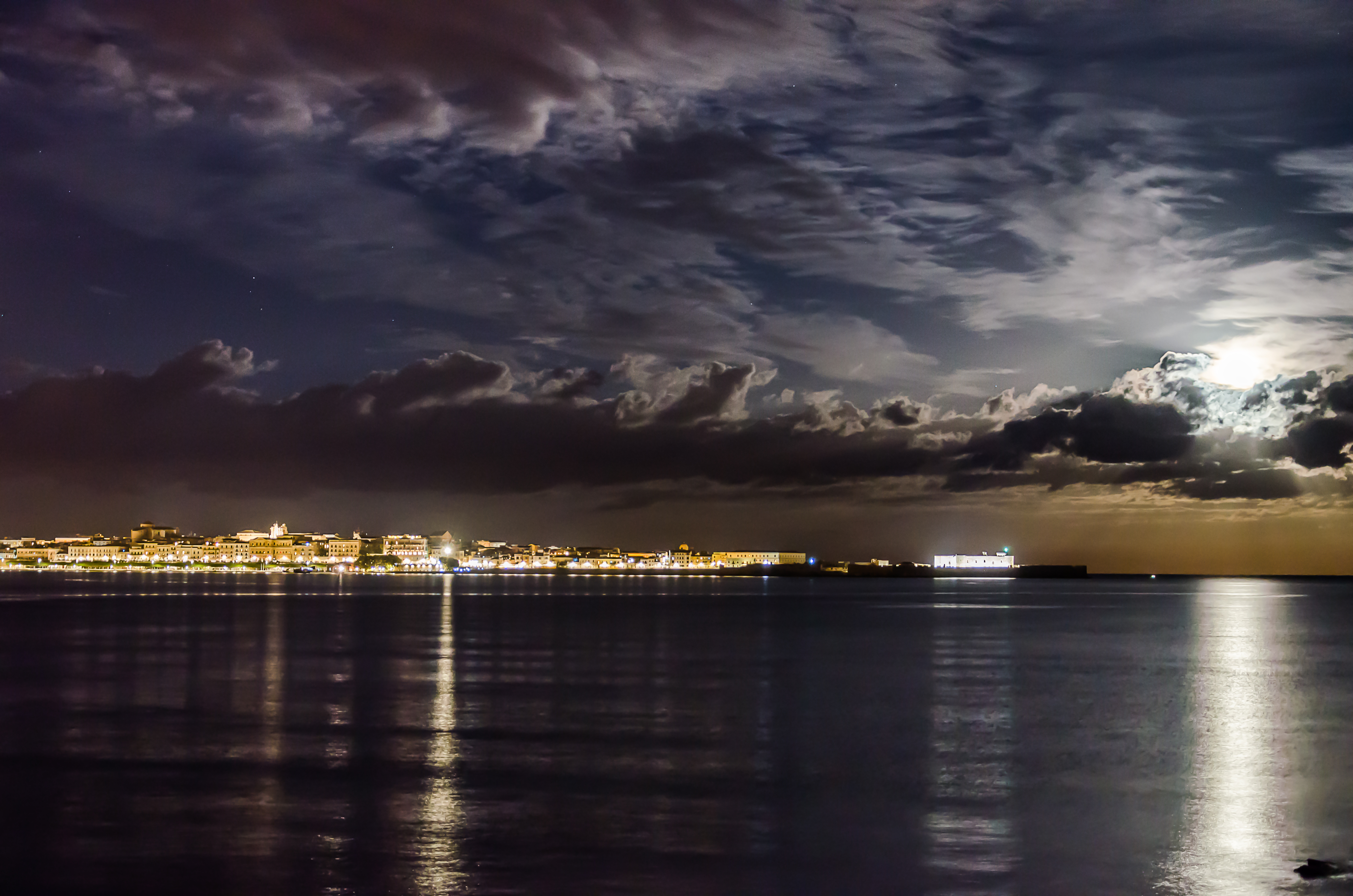
Night view of Syracuse

In 1735, Austrian Syracuse was besieged by the soldiers of the Infante of Spain Charles III of Spain and was the last Sicilian territory of Charles of Habsburg to yield to the new territorial arrangement established by European courts, doing so with significant damage, as the Spanish bombarded it with cannons for nearly the entire month of May.

There are conflicting accounts of the city's final surrender to the Bourbons: some contemporary chronicles state it occurred because the Germans ran out of ammunition and preferred honorable surrender terms over escalating the conflict; other accounts claim the Habsburg general surrendered following a miraculous episode: a bomb fell beside him, and he made a vow to Saint Lucy, promising to surrender the city to the Bourbons if his life was spared; as the bomb did not explode, he kept his word and declared surrender on 1 June 1735.

The new Italian rule (the Bourbons maintained the viceroyalty on the island, residing in the Kingdom of Naples, whose crown they held in personal union with Sicily's) brought Syracuse a long period of calm and detachment from European conflicts. This changed when Napoleon Bonaparte, following the French Revolution, invaded the Italian peninsula and seized the Bourbon states.

1812: Europe under the dominion and influence of France. Sicily was one of the few European countries that avoided incorporation into Napoleon's Empire

Having conquered the Kingdom of Naples, Napoleon prepared to invade Sicily but failed to complete his plan, as the island became a solid British military base: in 1798, the Royal Navy took possession of the Port of Syracuse. Admiral Horatio Nelson drew water from the Fountain of Arethusa (the fleet, en route to Egypt in pursuit of Napoleon, resupplied with food and water there), claiming that thanks to it, the British would defeat Napoleon (a temporary victory that indeed occurred days after their departure from Syracuse, during the Battle of the Nile, making his Aretusean stop famous).

Throughout the Napoleonic Wars, Sicily was under the military protection of the British Empire; this period is often referred to as the "English decade" in Sicily. Syracuse fully experienced this, as, alongside Palermo, it was a primary hub for military operations against Napoleon. The Aretusean city was enriched by the money of British soldiers, hosted the commander of the Mediterranean Fleet Cuthbert Collingwood and served as a naval base for Russian soldiers, who were later barred from Syracuse's waters by the British following the Treaty of Tilsit (a brief alliance between Tsar Alexander Romanov and Napoleon).

During the same period—from 1802 to 1807—Syracuse was also a naval base for soldiers of the United States, who, uninvolved in the Napoleonic Wars, were on the island to fight the Barbary Wars. (Note: Relations with the Americans strengthened when they established themselves in the Aretusean port to confront the African states of Tunis, Tripoli, and Algiers, which extorted their merchants: the United States paid exorbitant sums to appease North African corsairs, as, after declaring war on the British Empire, the British had withdrawn the commercial protection previously afforded to their former colonies. Syracuse thus welcomed them. The American consulate was set up in the noble palace of the Abela. A hospital for their wounded soldiers was also established. As with Nelson and the British fleet, Syracuse provided the Americans with abundant fresh water, enabling their operations to and from Tripoli, where the First Barbary War was concentrated: the soldiers of Thomas Jefferson brought Hamet Karamanli, the elder brother of the Bey of Tripoli Yusuf Karamanli and exiled heir to the throne in Tunis, to the city as a guest. He met King Ferdinand IV, who was temporarily residing in Syracuse in 1806, at Scala Greca and gifted him a precious golden sword.) They coexisted with the already present Russian navy, but when British soldiers also arrived, the Americans had to leave Syracuse (lingering tensions from the American Revolutionary War persisted). In 1816, after Napoleon's defeat, the Americans returned to Sicily to request from the Bourbons—now crowned sovereigns of the Kingdom of the Two Sicilies (the Congress of Vienna mandated the union of the Naples and Sicily crowns)—permission to make Syracuse their main Mediterranean base; the request was rejected but reiterated in 1848. The political context had changed, as the island had rebelled against the Bourbons and restored the Kingdom of Sicily; it was at war with the Neapolitan sovereign but refused the American offer, as England, then militarily protecting the Sicilians from the Bourbons, disapproved, and the Sicilians did not wish to lose British favor.

Syracuse rebelled only after the cholera epidemic of 1837, which decimated its population: the city was incited to believe the epidemic was deliberately caused by Bourbon government agents poisoning food and water. This led to a military revolt against Neapolitan soldiers and subsequent adherence to the existing Sicilian revolutionary movements. As a result, it lost the title of capital of the eastern Bourbon province of the Two Sicilies (which then included the western Hyblaean territories), which was transferred to Noto.

In 1849, the city surrendered to the Bourbon government without further violence (naval admirals from Great Britain and France negotiated a peaceful surrender for it), but by joining the Risorgimento movements for Italian unification, it was conquered a decade later by the Garibaldines and, with the rest of the island, became part of the Kingdom of Italy in 1861.

== Contemporary period ==
By the late 19th century, most Spanish-era fortifications were demolished, and the city began expanding onto the mainland from the island of Ortygia, whose maritime distance was almost entirely bridged by filling in the complex diamond-shaped structure, also dating to the Spanish period.

With the new political state, the Province of Syracuse was established in 1865, ending the Bourbon-era rivalry between Syracusans and the people of Noto. However, in the 1920s, the province underwent a territorial division, giving rise to the new Province of Ragusa.

This territorial split detached many Hyblaean municipalities that, in the early 20th century, had earned Syracusans the moniker "red province of Italy": the Russian Revolution of 1917, leading to the formation of the Soviet Union in 1922, resonated widely in Sicily, particularly in the Syracusan area, which became notably communist: in the southwestern Modica area, debates arose about establishing Soviets (ultimately deemed unsuitable by Sicilians), while in the northeastern Lentini, a Leninist and Bolshevik Republic was established (a unique case in Italy), though not politically recognized.

The rise of Bolshevism in the Syracusan area caused significant unrest; fascism quickly emerged in response, supplanting communism: Ragusa Ibla, then still politically tied to Syracuse, was the first Sicilian municipality to join Benito Mussolini’s party in 1919; Syracuse followed in 1920.

During the Fascist era, the Aretusean city harbored colonial ambitions: as a major commercial and military maritime hub for the new territories of Italian Africa, it requested Mussolini to declare it a free port and propose it as a main stop on the maritime route from the Suez Canal to the East Indies (both long-standing commercial goals). However, the Duce disappointed Syracusan expectations and diminished the port's initial importance.

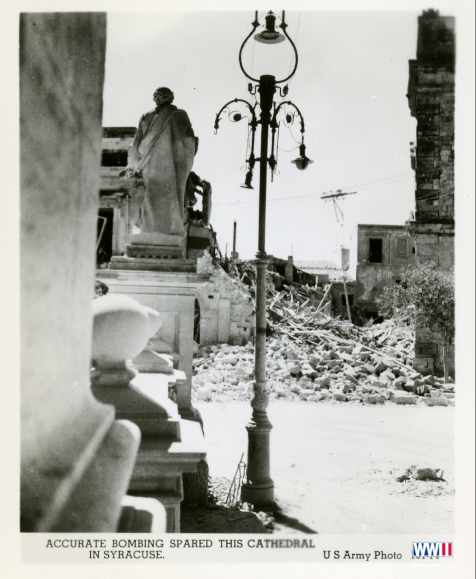
Syracuse, Piazza del Duomo amid the "targeted bombings" of 1943 (photo by the US Army, Official Photos Company of Hollywood)

During the initial phase of World War II, the city endured numerous air raids, largely due to its proximity to Malta, a key British military base. Several naval incidents occurred in its waters (mostly against the British from Malta); the most severe was the sinking of the liner Conte Rosso, which killed about 1,200 Italian soldiers.

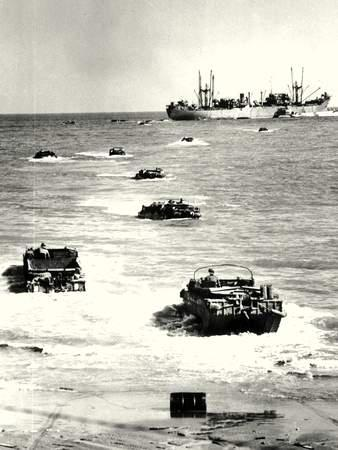
Part of the Allied amphibious landing on Syracusan beaches between the night of 9 July and 10 July 1943

In 1943, at the Casablanca Conference, the Allies decided to invade Sicily to force Italy out of the Axis powers. This alliance, formed in the late 1930s between Mussolini's Fascist Italy and Nazi Germany under Adolf Hitler, was extended in 1940 to Imperial Japan.

The Anglo-American armies assembled a formidable amphibious assault force targeting the island's southeastern coast: the Eastern Naval Task Force, under Admiral Bertram Ramsay, carried the 8th Army on 810 warships and 715 amphibious vehicles (from Alexandria, Suez, and Haifa; British strongholds).

Before the ships landed, Syracuse was targeted on the evening of 9 July 1943 by Operation Ladbroke: a British initiative involving the launch of airborne troops to sabotage Aretusean coastal defenses, which would have hindered the landing. Although the operation was not successful (due to numerous British casualties from faulty drops and resistance near the Anapo river), the arrival of Scottish troops, who had landed at Cassibile, led to the city's capitulation on the evening of 10 July.

The capture of Syracuse also secured Augusta: together, they formed Sicily's strongest military base; their rapid fall caused dismay among Axis high commands (the village of Priolo Gargallo fell on 11 July, Melilli, the base's command seat, fell on 12 July, as did Augusta). The final bombings of Syracuse were conducted by the Luftwaffe and Regia Aeronautica, targeting mainly the capital, Augusta, and Avola, where the bulk of the British fleet was stationed.

Syracuse was the initial seat of the Allied Military Government of Occupied Territories (AMGOT). Near the village of Cassibile, in the Santa Teresa Longarini district, at the fortified San Michele manor, where senior Anglo-American officers were housed (including General Dwight D. Eisenhower, future President of the United States), the armistice between Italy and the Allies was signed on 3 September 1943.

The armistice led to Italy's exit from the Axis and its co-belligerency with the Allies. Despite Benito Mussolini's deposition and the formation of the Kingdom of the South, under Victor Emmanuel III, as the Italian Liberation War began, the Anglo-Americans maintained occupation of the island until the final phase of World War II. During this period, Sicilians developed an independence movement favoring a Sicily belonging to the Americans or British (these aspirations ceased as the other Allied power, the Soviet Union, which did not participate in the Sicilian landing, signaled to the occupiers that it would not permit Sicily's detachment from Italy).

Syracuse, largely uninvolved in the separatist events that primarily affected western Sicily, was a key point for the Allies to monitor developments: they took particular care to prevent the rise of communist or fascist political movements in the city. The various political factions in the Sicilian conflict subsided following the Yalta Conference in February 1945, when the Allies agreed to return Sicily to Italy, which subsequently granted the island special autonomy.

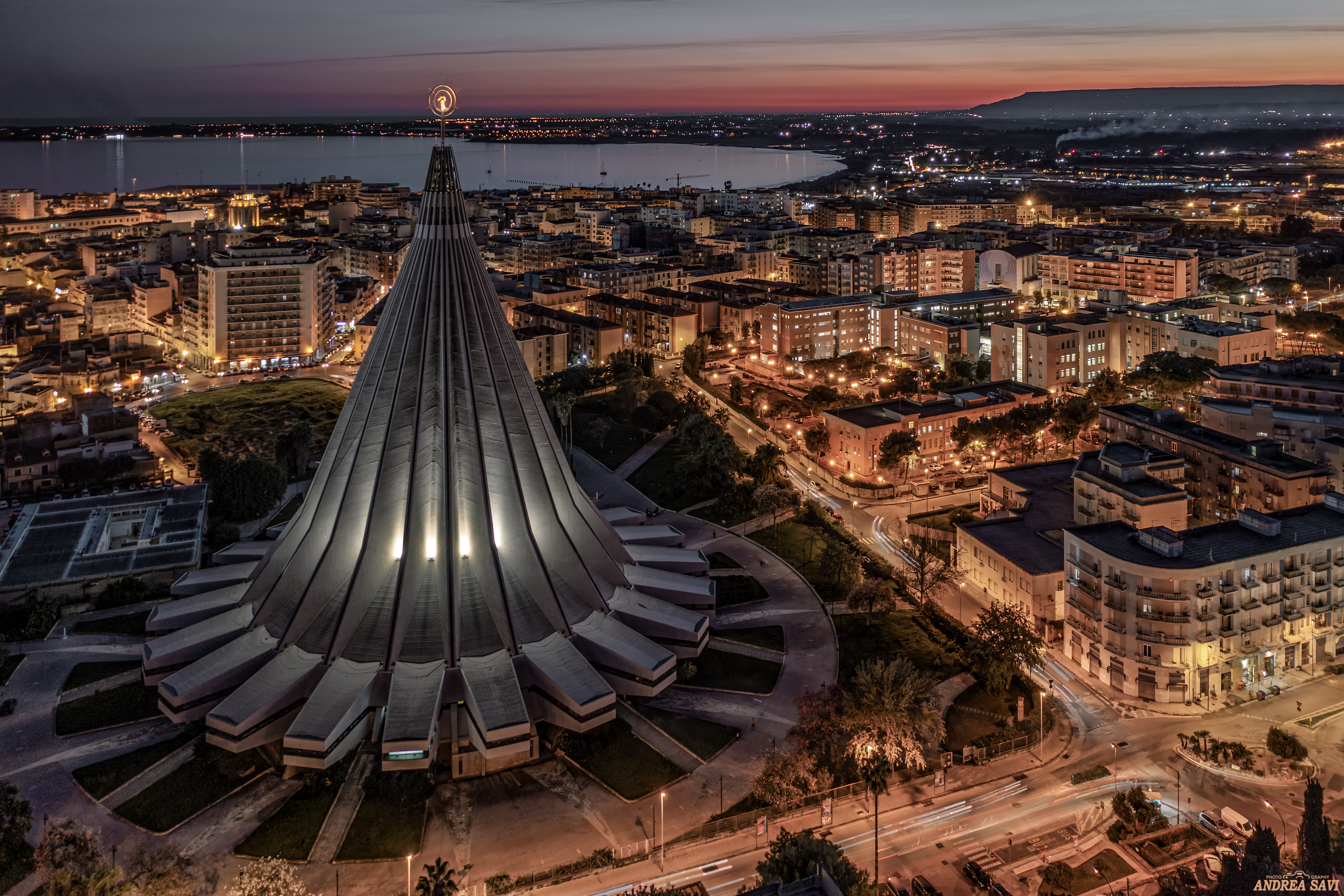
The Basilica Sanctuary Madonna delle Lacrime in the modern Aretusean district of Neapolis

In the post-war period, Syracuse saw industrial and urban development. Between the Bay of Santa Panagia, Priolo Gargallo, Melilli, and Augusta, the Syracuse petrochemical complex was built—one of Europe's largest, yielding significant economic benefits but also negative impacts due to air and soil pollution.

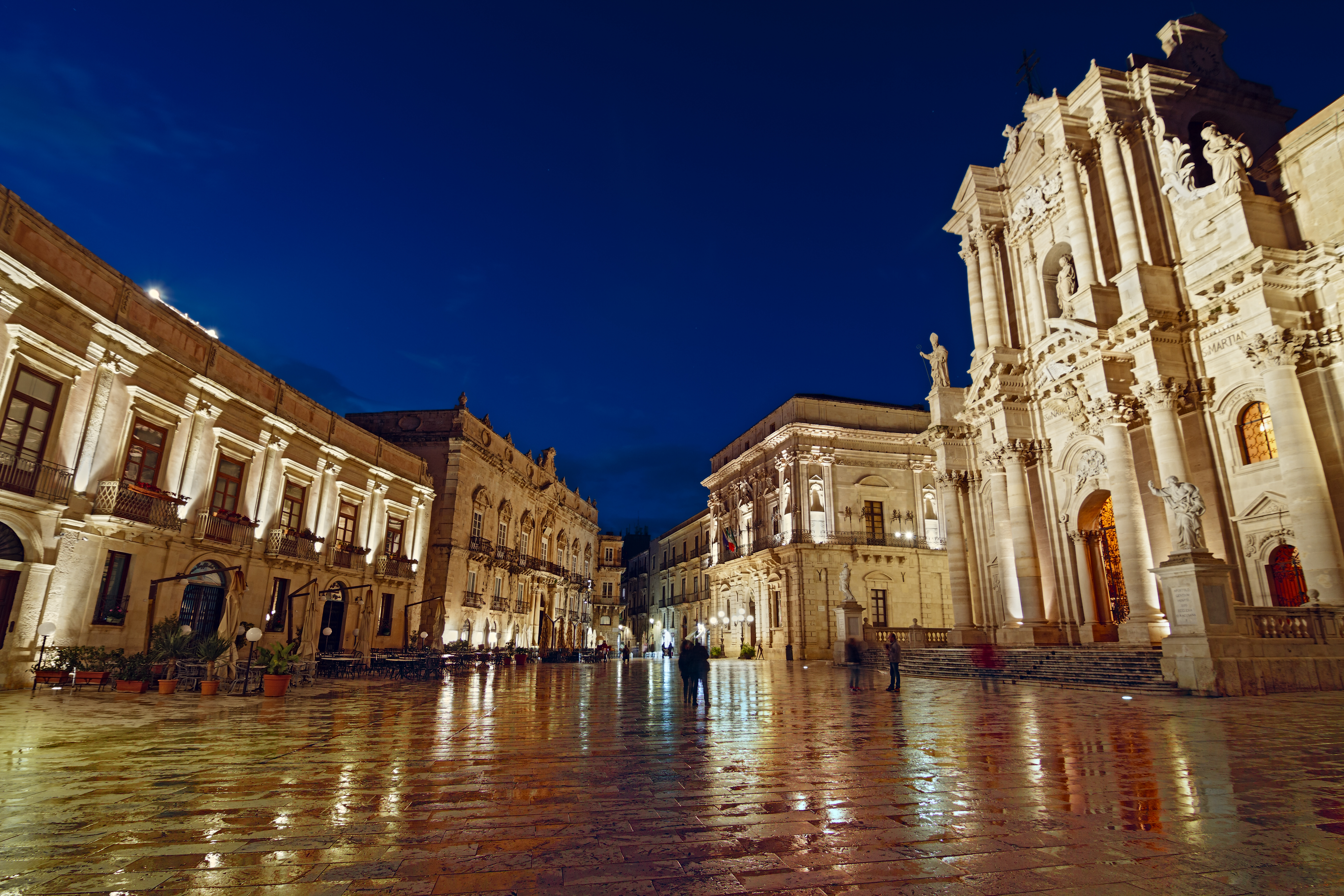
Ortygia, present-day Piazza del Duomo: on the right, the former Temple of Athena, now the Syracuse Cathedral; beside it, the former Temple of Artemis, now the Senate Palace

In 1953, a religious event occurred that the Catholic Church later declared miraculous: from a plaster Marian effigy, later named the Madonna delle Lacrime, tears repeatedly flowed (scientifically identified in a laboratory as human-like), accompanied by unexplained healings. The widespread attention generated by this event led to the construction of the eponymous sanctuary, completed decades later and inaugurated by Pope John Paul II in 1994.

In 2006, the President of the Italian Republic, Carlo Azeglio Ciampi, visited to unveil a plaque commemorating the inclusion of Syracuse, together with the prehistoric site of the rocky necropolis of Pantalica, among the World Heritage Sites protected by UNESCO conventions.

Although Syracuse participates in several internationally significant projects (such as its involvement in the Smarter Cities Challenge, which led it to become, in 2012, in collaboration with the CNR, Italy's pioneering smart city, 2.0), its current socio-economic situation remains challenging, in line with the broader Sicilian context. Recently, its tertiary sector has grown, particularly due to tourism.

== See also ==
- Timeline of Syracuse, Sicily

== Bibliography ==
- Abulafia, David (1991). Le due Italie: relazioni economiche fra il regno normanno di Sicilia e i comuni settentrionali [The Two Italies: Economic Relations Between the Norman Kingdom of Sicily and the Northern Communes]. Translated by Cosima Campagnolo, with an introductory note by Giuseppe Galasso. Naples: Guida Editori.
- Amari, Michele (1858). Storia dei musulmani di Sicilia [History of the Muslims of Sicily]. Vol. 2. Florence: Felice Le Monnier.
- Bernabò Brea, Luigi (2016). La Sicilia prima dei greci [Sicily Before the Greeks]. Il Saggiatore. ISBN 978-88-6576-518-0.
- De Sanctis, Gaetano (1972). Silvio Accame (ed.). Scritti minori [Minor Writings]. Vol. 1. Rome: Ed. di Storia e Letteratura.
- Di Blasi e Gambacorta, Giovanni E. (2009). Storia del regno di Sicilia dell'epoca oscura e favolosa sino al 1774 [History of the Kingdom of Sicily from the Obscure and Legendary Era to 1774]. Vol. 1, 2, 3. Palermo: Stamperia Oretea.
- Mattei, Paul (2012). Il cristianesimo antico, da Gesù a Costantino [Early Christianity, from Jesus to Constantine]. Bologna: Il Mulino. p. 118.
- Miceli, Melinda (2013). Siracusa provincia d'Europa [Syracuse, Province of Europe]. Sebastiano Monieri Editore. ISBN 978-88-905983-7-1.
- Moisé, Filippo (1841). Storia dei dominii stranieri in Italia: dalla caduta dell'impero romano in occidente fino ai nostri giorni [History of Foreign Dominions in Italy: From the Fall of the Roman Empire in the West to the Present Day]. Vol. 4. Florence: V. Batelli.
- Palmeri, Niccolò (1834). Somma della Storia di Sicilia [Summary of the History of Sicily]. Vol. 1. Spampinato.
- Rinaldi, Giancarlo (2008). Cristianesimi nell'antichità [Christianities in Antiquity]. Chieti-Rome: GBU. p. 247.
- Rollin, Charles (1828). Storia antica e romana di Carlo Rollin [Ancient and Roman History by Charles Rollin]. Vol. 9. G. Galletti.
- Santuccio, Salvatore (2010). Governare la città. Territorio, amministrazione e politica a Siracusa (1817-1865) [Governing the City: Territory, Administration, and Politics in Syracuse (1817–1865)]. Milan: Ed. Franco Angeli. ISBN 978-88-568-3082-8.
- Scinà, Domenico (1840). Storia letteraria di Sicilia ne' tempi greci [Literary History of Sicily in Greek Times]. Naples: Tipografia Trani.
- Sordi, Marta (1983). "Alessandro Magno e l'eredità di Siracusa" [Alexander the Great and the Legacy of Syracuse]. Aevum (Year 57, no. 1). Milan: Faculty of Letters, Catholic University of the Sacred Heart: 14–23.
- Trigilia, Melchiorre (1990). La Madonna dei Milici di Scicli [The Madonna dei Milici of Scicli]. Modica: Setim.
