= Arethusa =

Arethusa may refer to:

== Mythology ==
- Arethusa (nymph), a nymph who became a fountain in Greek mythology
- Arethusa (mythology), several other Greek mythological figures also called Arethusa

== Places ==
- Arethusa (Mygdonia), an ancient city in Mygdonia of ancient Macedonia
- Arethusa, ancient name of Al-Rastan, Syria
- Arethusa (see), a titular see of Syria near Apamea
- Arethousa, a municipal unit in the Thessaloniki regional unit, Greece
- Arethousa, Ikaria, a village on the Greek island Ikaria
- Arethusa Falls, one of the highest waterfalls in New Hampshire, USA
- Antipatris, refounded in 64–63 BC by Pompey as Arethusa
- Fountain of Arethusa, a fountain in Ortygia, Sicily, named from the above-mentioned nereid

== Maritime ==
- Arethusa-class cruiser (disambiguation), two classes of Royal Navy cruiser
  - Arethusa-class cruiser (1913), eight light cruisers built in 1912–1914 that served in World War I
  - Arethusa-class cruiser (1934), four light cruisers built in 1934–1936 that served in World War II
- Aréthuse-class submarine, a class of French submarine, in service 1958-1981
- HMS Arethusa, nine ships of the Royal Navy, 1759 to 1991
  - The Saucy Arethusa, a ballad about the action of 17 June 1778
- Three training ships operated by the Shaftesbury Homes and Arethusa charity
  - Arethusa, formerly HMS Arethusa (1849)
  - Arethusa II (1932–1975), formerly Peking (ship)
  - Arethusa III, a much smaller ketch used as a training ship
- French ship Aréthuse, various ships of the French Navy
- USS Arethusa, three ships of the United States Navy 1864 to 1946

== Science ==
- Arethusa (plant), a monospecific genus of orchids (Dragon's mouth, Arethusa bulbosa)
- Arethusa De Montfort, 1808, a foram
- Arethusa Barrande, 1846, the occupied name for a trilobite, now renamed to Aulacopleura
- Arethusa Oken, 1815, a synonym for the Portuguese man o' war
  - Arethusa caravell Oken, 1815, a synonym for the Portuguese man o' war
- 95 Arethusa, an asteroid

== Other ==
- Arethusa (journal), an academic journal
- Arethusa (painting), an 1802 painting by Benjamin West
- "Arethusa", a poem by Percy Bysshe Shelley
- Aretousa, a main character in the early 17th century romance Erotokritos
- Arethusa, the writer of a letter in Propertius, 4.3 ('Arethusa sends these instructions to her lycotas,')
- Shaftesbury Homes and Arethusa, one of the oldest charities dealing with children in the United Kingdom
  - Arethusa, a residential activities centre in Upnor, Kent, run by Shaftesbury Homes and Arethusa

== See also ==
- Arethusana
- Aréthuse (disambiguation)
