= Aréthuse =

Aréthuse or Arethuse may refer to:

- Arethusa (nymph), a nymph in Greek mythology known as Aréthuse in French
- Aréthuse-class submarine, a class of French Navy submarines
- French ship Aréthuse, various ships of the French Navy
- Fountain of Arethusa, sometimes referred to as Arethuse

== See also ==
- Arethusa (disambiguation)
