= Spirito Santo, Siracusa =

Church in Sicily, Italy

Spirito Santo
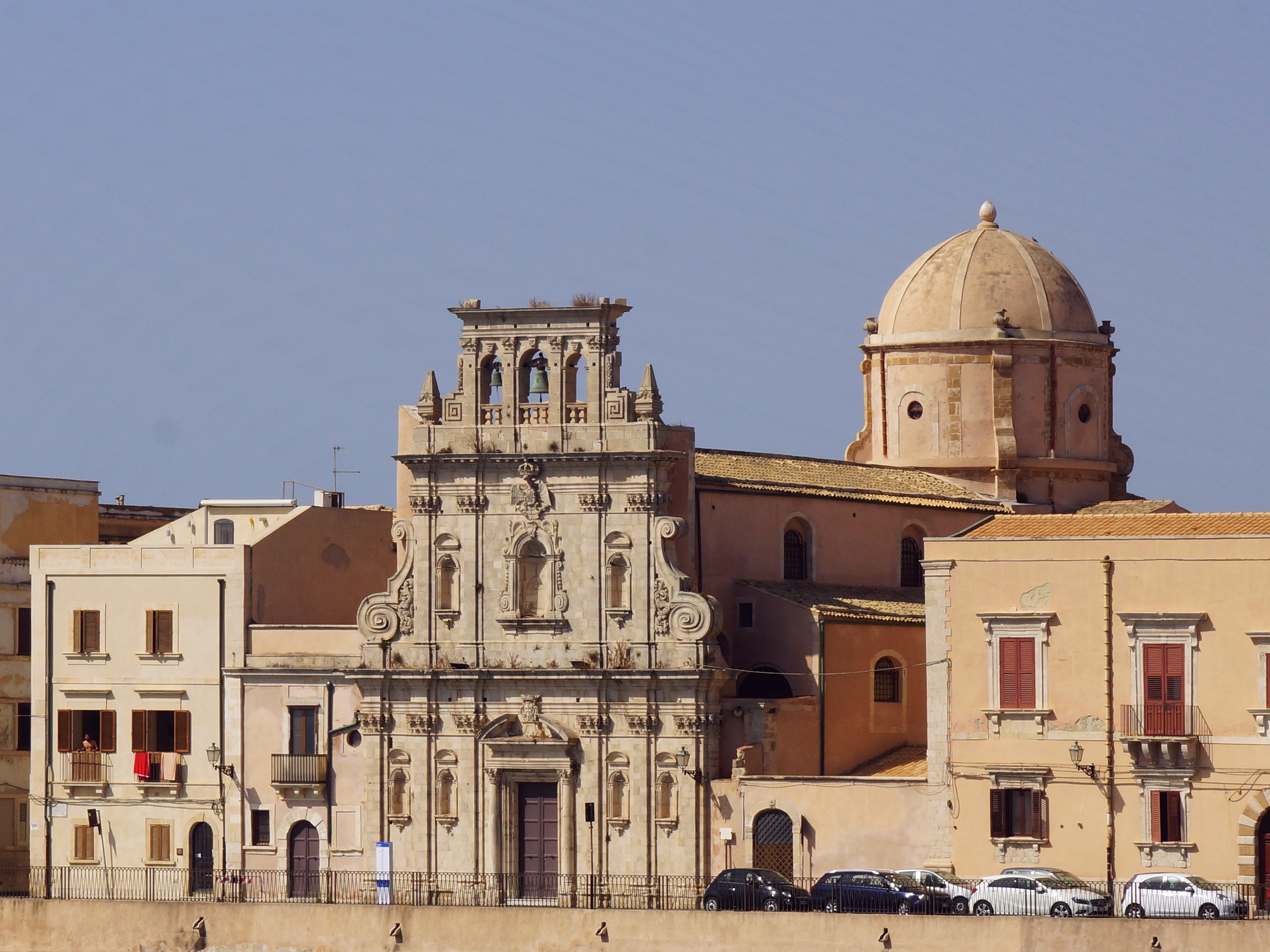
- Facade and dome

Religion
- Affiliation: Catholic Church
- Province: Siracusa

Location
- Location: Siracusa, Italy
- Interactive map of Spirito Santo
- Coordinates: 37°03′22″N 15°17′43″E

Architecture
- Type: Church
- Style: Baroque
- Completed: 1727

Spirito Santo is a baroque-style, Roman Catholic church located on Lungomare Ortigia #4, facing towards the Ionian sea, on the island of Ortigia, in the historic city center of Siracusa in Sicily, Italy.

== Description ==
A church at the site stood apparently since the 4th century, but had been damaged severely by earthquakes including one in 1542, culminating in its toppling during the 1693 Sicily earthquake. It was rebuilt during the rule of the Spanish in Sicily by the architect Pompeo Picherali in 1727.

Since 1652, the church has been sponsored by the Confraternity of the Holy Spirit. Members of the lay confraternity, dressed in hooded robes, had privileges of carrying out processions with displays of "mysteries" related to the Passion during Holy Week. Just above the door is a shield with the double cross symbol of the Confraternity. Above this is a royal heraldic shield, likely a Spanish Bourbon symbol with a single headed eagle with a crown above.

The interior of the church has suffered greatly from age. The membership in the confraternity is flagging. In 1974, burglars stole an 18th-century silver chalice and an altarpiece from the school of Antonello da Messina. The interior of the building is closed and in need of repair. An external staircase has been added to allow visitors to rise to roof-level, and see both skyline of Ortigia and the sea. Accessibility at present is unknown, and restoration is planned.
