= French ship Aréthuse =

Eleven ships of the French Navy have borne the name Aréthuse in honour of the nymph Arethusa:

- Aréthuse (1757), a frigate
- Aréthuse (1791), a frigate
- Aréthuse (1798), a corvette
- Aréthuse (1801), a frigate
- Aréthuse (1805), a frigate
- Aréthuse (1812), a frigate
- Aréthuse (1885), a cruiser
- Aréthuse (1916), an Amphitrite-class submarine launched in 1916 and struck in 1927
- Aréthuse (NN7), an Argonaute-class submarine launched in 1929 and struck in 1946
- Aréthuse (S635), lead vessel of the Aréthuse class of submarines launched in 1957 and struck in 1979

== Sources and references ==
- Les bâtiments ayant porté le nom d'Aréthuse, netmarine.net
- Roche, Jean-Michel (2005). Dictionnaire des bâtiments de la flotte de guerre française de Colbert à nos jours 1 1671–1870. ISBN 978-2-9525917-0-6. OCLC 165892922.
