= USS Arethusa =

USS Arethusa may refer to the following ships of the United States Navy:

- USS Arethusa (1864), a collier for the Union Navy in the American Civil War.
- USS Arethusa (AO-7), a fleet oiler for the Navy in World War I.
- USS Arethusa (IX-135), a mobile floating tanker for the Navy in World War II.

== See also ==
- HMS Arethusa
