= Arethusa (journal) =

- Discipline: Classics, cultural studies
- Language: English
- Edited by: Roger D. Woodard

Publication details
- History: 1967–present
- Publisher: Johns Hopkins University Press (United States)
- Frequency: Triannually

Standard abbreviations
- ISO 4: Arethusa

Indexing
- ISSN: 0004-0975 (print); 1080-6504 (web)
- OCLC no.: 31864718

Links
- Journal homepage; Online access

Arethusa is an academic journal established in 1967. It covers the field of Classics using an interdisciplinary approach incorporating contemporary theoretical perspectives and more traditional approaches to literary and material evidence. It frequently features issues focused on a theme related the classical world. The current Editor in chief of the journal is Roger D. Woodard (SUNY Buffalo). The journal is named for the mythological nymph Arethusa and published three times each year in January, May, and September by the Johns Hopkins University Press.

== Special issues of Arethusa ==
The issues below are examples of themed issues from Arethusa.
5.1 Politics and Art in Augustan Literature (Spring 1972)
6.1 Women in Antiquity (Spring 1973)
7.1 Psychoanalysis and the Classics (Spring 1974)
8.1 Marxism and the Classics (Spring 1975)
8.2 Population Policy in Plato and Aristotle (Fall 1975)
9.2 The New Archilochus (Fall 1976)
10.1 Classical Literature and Contemporary Literary Theory (Spring 1977)
11.1/2 Women in the Ancient World (1978)
13.1 Augustan Poetry Books (1980)
13.2 Indo-European Roots of Classical Culture (Fall 1980)
14.1 Virgil: 2000 Years (Spring 1981)
15.1/2 Texts and Contexts: American Classical Studies in Honor of J.-P. Vernant (1982)
16.1/2 Semiotics and Classical Studies (1983)
17.1 Studies in Latin Literature (Spring 1984)
17.2 Under the Text (Fall 1984)
19.2 Audience-Oriented Criticism and the Classics (Fall 1986)
20.1/2 Herodotus and the Invention of History (Spring/Fall 1987)
22 The Challenge of "Black Athena" (Fall 1989)
23.1 Pastoral Revisions (Spring 1990)
25.1 Reconsidering Ovid's Fasti (Winter 1992)
26.2 Bakhtin and Ancient Studies: Dialogues and Dialogics (Spring 1993)
27.1 Rethinking the Classical Canon (Winter 1994)
28.2/3 Horace: 2000 Years (Spring/Fall 1995)
29.2 The New Simonides (Spring 1996)
30.2 The Iliad and its Contexts (Spring 1997)
31.3 Vile Bodies: Roman Satire and Corporeal Discourse (Fall 1998)
33.2 Fallax Opus: Approaches to Reading Roman Elegy (Spring 2000)
33.3 Elites in Late Antiquity (Fall 2000)
34.2 The Personal Voice in Classical Scholarship: Literary and Theoretical Reflections (Spring 2001)
35.1 Epos and Mythos: Language and Narrative in Homeric Epic (Winter 2002)
35.3 The Reception of Ovid in Antiquity (Fall 2002)
36.2 Re-Imagining Pliny the Younger (Spring 2003)
36.3 Center and Periphery in the Roman World (Fall 2003)
37.3 The Poetics of Deixis in Alcman, Pindar, and Other Lyric (Fall 2004)
39.2 Ingens Eloquentiae Materia: Rhetoric and Empire in Tacitus (Spring 2006)
39.3 Ennius and the Invention of Roman Epic (Fall 2006)
40.1 Reshaping of Rome: Space, Time, and memory in Augustan Transformation (Winter 2007)
40.2 Statius' Silvae and the Poetics of Intimacy (Spring 2007)
41.1 Celluloid Classics: New Perspectives on Classical Antiquity in Modern Cinema (Winter 2008)
43.2 The Art of Art History in Greco-Roman Antiquity (Spring 2010)
45.3 Collectors and the Eclectic: New Approaches to Roman Domestic Decoration (Fall 2012)
46.2 Pliny the Younger in Late Antiquity (Spring 2013)
49.2. Vitruvius: Text, Architecture, Reception (Spring 2016)
49.3 Envois: New Readings in Cicero's Letters (Fall 2016)
53.2 Material Girls: Gender and Material Culture in Ancient Greece and Rome (Spring 2020)
53.3 Ovid, Rhetoric, and Freedom of Speech in the Augustan Age (Fall 2020)
54.3 Origins and Original Moments (Fall 2021)
55.3 The Reception of Greek Tragedy: Studies in Celebration of the 90th Birthday of John J. Peradotto (Fall 2022)
