= French submarine Argonaute (S636) =

French Aréthuse-class submarine

Coordinates: 48°53′40″N 2°23′22″E

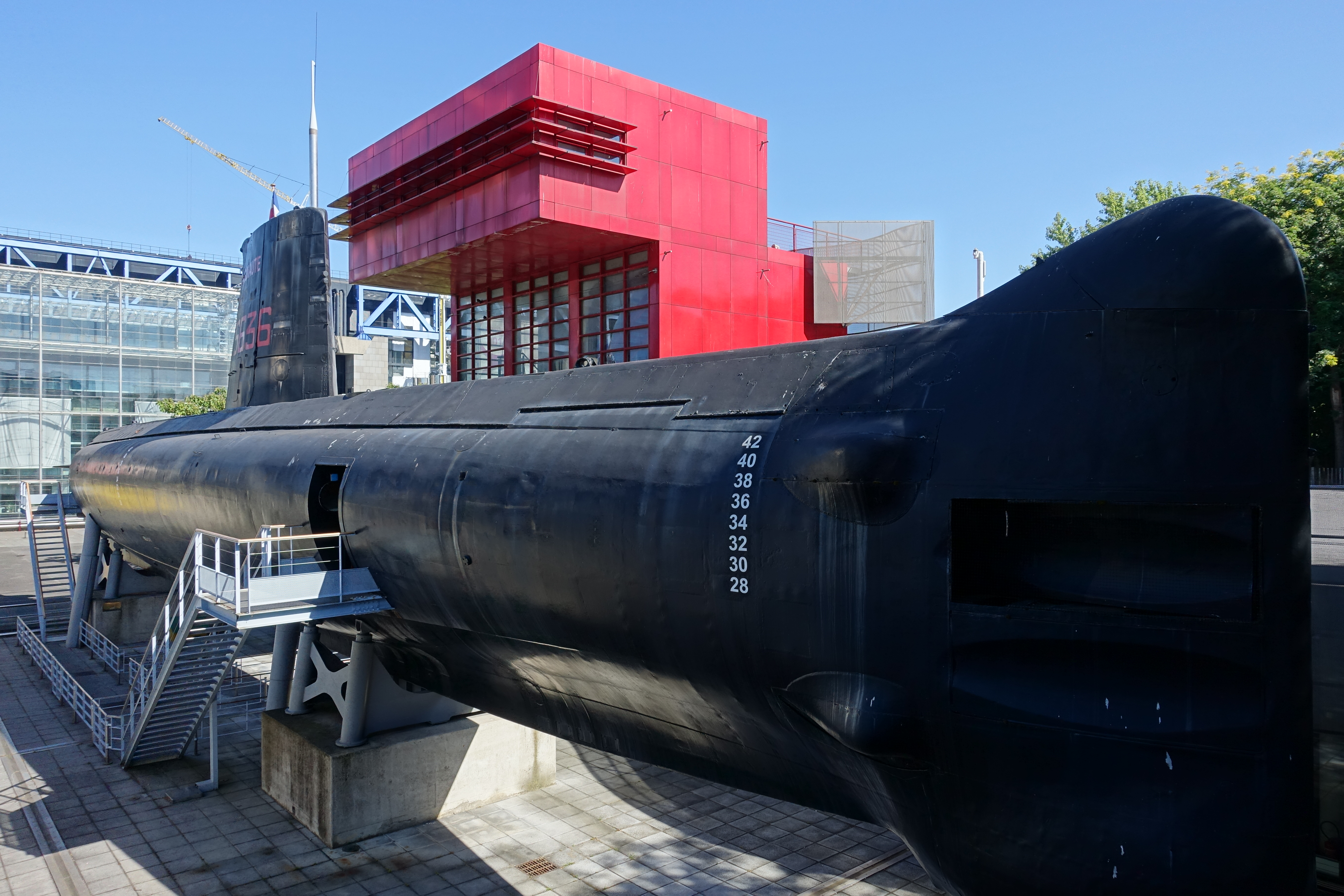
- Argonaute on display in Paris

History

France
- Name: Argonaute
- Namesake: Argonauts
- Ordered: 1953
- Builder: Arsenal de Cherbourg, Cherbourg, France
- Laid down: March 1955
- Launched: 29 June 1957
- Decommissioned: 31 July 1982
- Identification: Pennant number: S 636
- Status: Museum ship

General characteristics
- Class & type: Aréthuse-class submarine
- Displacement: 552 t (543 long tons) surfaced; 680 t (669 long tons) submerged
- Length: 49.6 m (162 ft 9 in)
- Beam: 5.8 m (19 ft 0 in)
- Draught: 4 m (13 ft 1 in)
- Propulsion: 1 shaft; 2 × 12-cylinder SEMT Pielstick diesel engines 790 kW (1,060 bhp); 1 electric motor 970 kW (1,300 hp)
- Speed: 12.5 knots (23.2 km/h; 14.4 mph) surfaced; 16 knots (30 km/h; 18 mph) submerged
- Complement: 40
- Sensors & processing systems: DUUA I sonar
- Armament: 4 × 550 mm (21.7 in) torpedo tubes (8 torpedoes carried)

Argonaute (S 636) is an Aréthuse-class submarine, and the fourth ship of the French Navy (French: Marine Nationale) to bear the name. Launched on 29 June 1957, the submarine served as flagship within the Toulon submarine squadron. Argonaute was decommissioned on 31 July 1982. The vessel was converted to a museum ship in 1989 and located in Paris.

== Description ==
Designated "hunter submarines" (French: Sous-marins de Chasse) by the French Navy the Aréthuse class were designed as attack submarines specifically for operations in the Mediterranean Sea. The design retained a small silhouette and great manoeverability. They had a standard displacement of 410 tonnes (400 long tons), 552 t (543 long tons) surfaced and 680 t (669 long tons) submerged. Argonaute is 49.6 metres (162 ft 9 in) long with a beam of 5.8 m (19 ft 0 in) and a draught of 4 m (13 ft 1 in). The Aréthuse class were the first French submarines to use a diesel-electric propulsion system and were powered by two 12-cylinder SEMT Pielstick diesel engines driving one shaft rated at 790 kilowatts (1,060 bhp) surfaced. They also mounted two electric generators that produced 337 kW (452 hp) connected to one electric motor for use while submerged rated at 970 kW (1,300 hp). The generators were placed on spring suspensions and the motor was attached directly to the shaft creating a near-silent operational environment while submerged. Argonaute had a maximum speed of 12.5 knots (23.2 km/h; 14.4 mph) surfaced and 16 knots (30 km/h; 18 mph) submerged.

Argonaute was armed with four torpedo tubes in the bow for four 550 mm (21.7 in) torpedoes. The submarine carried four reloads. The class was designed primarily for anti-submarine warfare. Argonaute was initially equipped with DUUA I sonar. The Aréthuse-class submarines had a complement of 40 including 6 officers. By 1981, Argonaute's sonar had been upgraded to one active DUUA II sonar, one passive DUUA II sonar, one passive ranging DUUX 2 sonar. The submarine had a diving depth down to roughly 182.8 metres (600 ft).

== Service history ==
Argonaute, were ordered as part of the 1953 construction programme. The submarine was constructed at the Arsenal de Cherbourg in Cherbourg, France and was laid down in March 1955. The submarine was launched on 29 June 1957 and commissioned on 11 February 1959. Argonaute operated exclusively in the Mediterranean Sea as a deterrent against threats to commercial shipping between France and its colonies in North Africa. Argonaute was taken out of service and placed in reserve in 1982.

== Museum ship ==
In 1982, the Association of Friends of the Maritime Museum for the Atlantic (French: l'Association des amis du Musée de la mer pour l'Atlantique) selected Argonaute to save from scrapping. The Minister of Defence, Charles Hernu, agreed to save the submarine in 1984 after it was to become part of a permanent exhibition devoted to history of submarines and the technologies used in their construction at Cité des sciences et de l'industrie in La Villette Park, Paris.

Argonaute, in reserve since 1982, was transported in 1989 on a 94 m (308 ft) barge, itself pulled by a tug, which arrived in Le Havre three weeks later via Gibraltar. The barge then went up the Seine to Gennevilliers where a dozen float balloons were added to raise the draught of the barge. Then the barge passed through the seven locks of the Saint-Denis Canal. Once at the quay on the Canal de l'Ourcq, Argonaute was lifted from the water by cranes and transported 400 metres (1,300 ft) by trailer to its current site. Argonaute opened to the public in 1991, outside the Cité des sciences et de l'industrie, 30 Avenue Corentin Cariou, in the 19th arrondissement of Paris. In 2018, the permanent exhibition underwent an overhaul to include information about the future of the oceans.

== See also ==
- List of submarines of France
- List of museums in Paris
