= French frigate Aréthuse (1801) =

Gun

History

France
- Name: Aréthuse
- Namesake: Arethusa
- Launched: 1790
- Acquired: 14 July 1801
- Decommissioned: 27 October 1802
- Fate: Returned

General characteristics
- Type: Frigate
- Armament: 40 guns

Aréthuse was an Italian-built 40-gun frigate of the French Navy.

Aréthuse was built in 1790, and offered to France by Ferdinand I on 14 July 1801.

She was decommissioned on 27 October 1802 and returned to Ferdinand I, along with Sibille and Cérès.

== Sources and references ==
- Les bâtiments ayant porté le nom d'Aréthuse, netmarine.net
- Roche, Jean-Michel (2005). "ARETHUSE - Frégate (1801 - 1802)". Dictionnaire des bâtiments de la flotte de guerre française de Colbert à nos jours 1 1671 - 1870. Toulon: Roche. ISBN 978-2-9525917-0-6. OCLC 165892922.
