= Arethusa-class cruiser =

Arethusa-class cruiser may refer to:

- Arethusa-class cruiser (1913), a class of eight Royal Navy light cruisers built in 1912–1914 that served in World War I
- Arethusa-class cruiser (1934), a class of four Royal Navy light cruisers built in 1934–1936 that served in World War II
