= Ortygia =

Island in Syracuse, Sicily, Italy

Ortigia Ὀρτυγία
UNESCO World Heritage Site
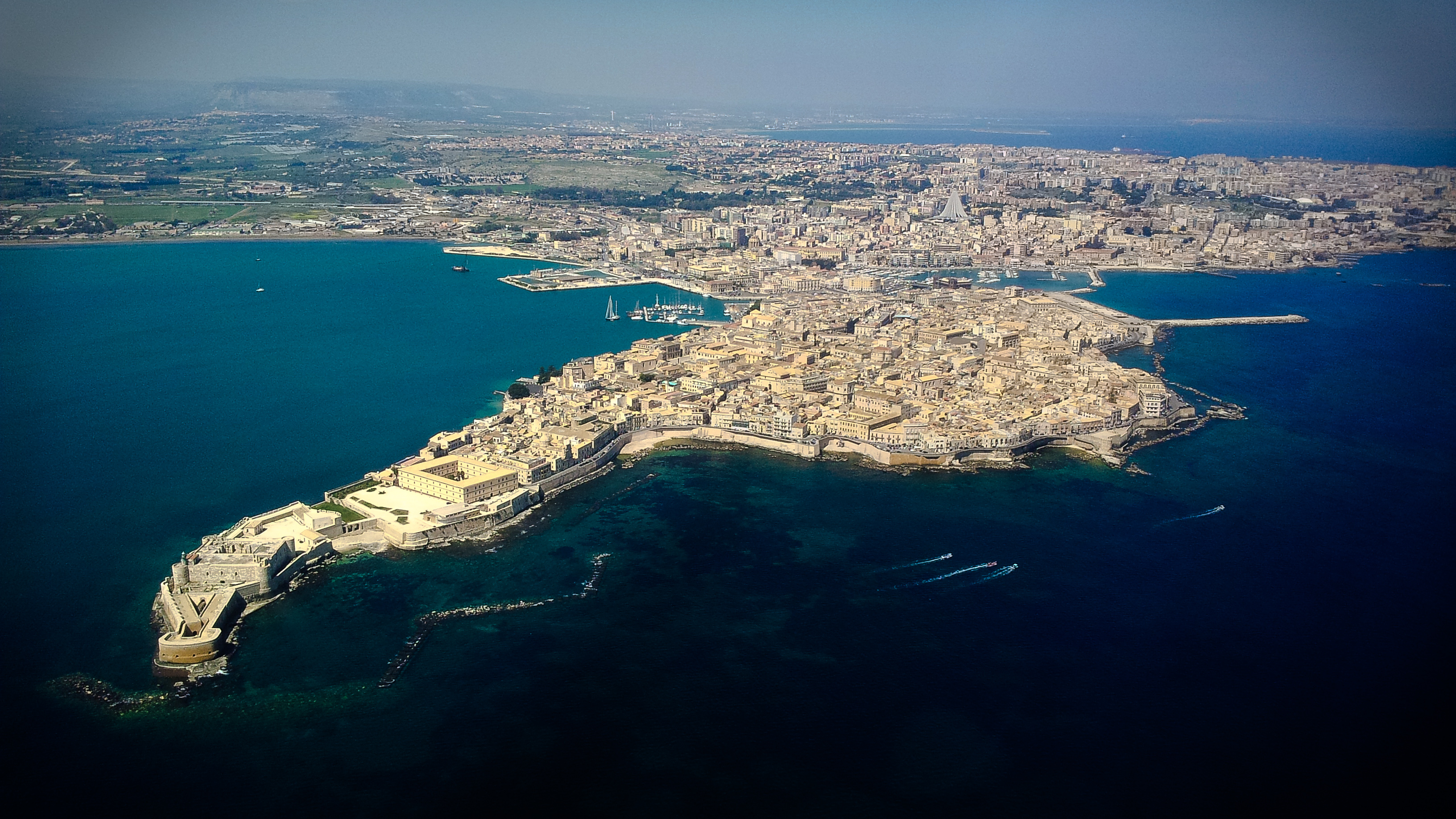
- Aerial view of Ortygia, the historic heart of ancient Syracuse

- Location within Italy Location within Sicily
- Location: Syracuse, Sicily, Italy
- Criteria: Cultural: ii, iii, iv
- Reference: 1200
- Inscription: 2005 (29th Session)
- Area: 146 ha (360 acres)
- Buffer zone: 2,149 ha (5,310 acres)
- Coordinates: 37°3′33″N 15°17′8″E

Ortygia (/ɔːrˈtɪdʒiə/ or-TIJ-ee-ə; Italian: Ortigia [orˈtiːdʒa]; Ancient Greek: Ὀρτυγία, romanized: Ortygía) is a small island which is the historical centre of the city of Syracuse, Sicily. The island, also known as the Città Vecchia (Old City), contains many historical landmarks.

The name originates from the Ancient Greek órtyx (ὄρτυξ), which means "quail".

== Overview ==
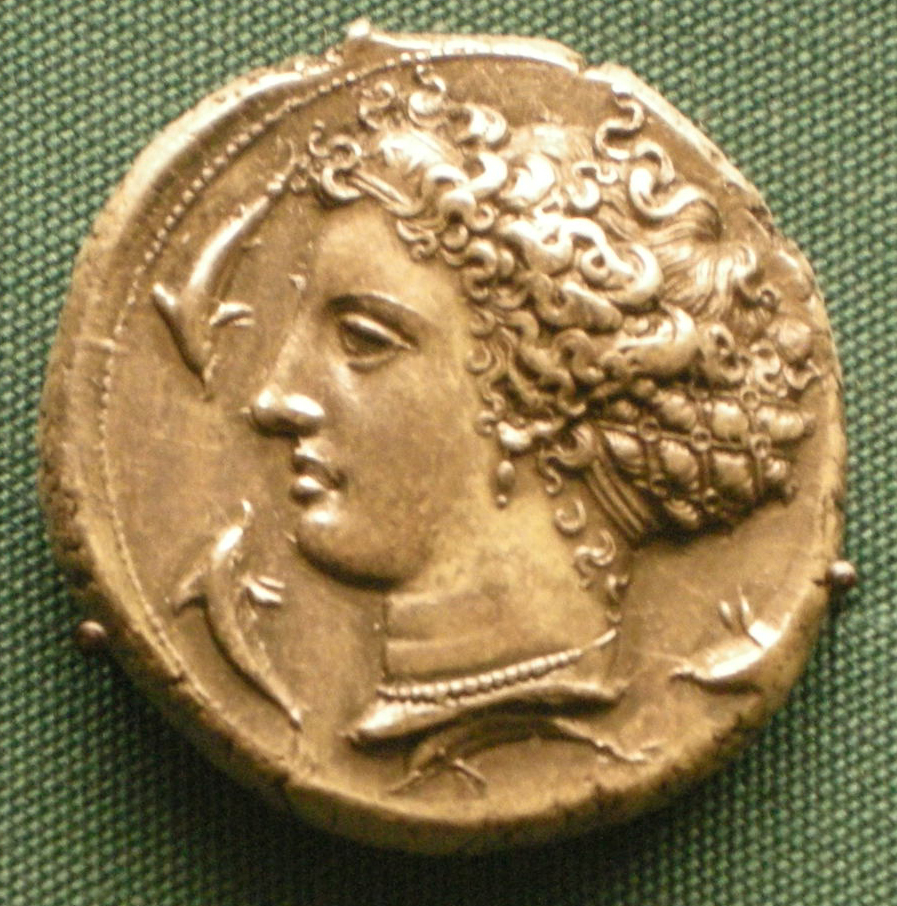
Arethusa on a coin of Syracuse, Sicily, 415–400 BC

Ortygia is a small island forming the historical centre of the city of Syracuse, Sicily. It contains many of the city’s oldest landmarks, including the Temple of Apollo, the Fountain of Arethusa, and the Cathedral of Syracuse, originally a Greek temple.

In 2005, Ortygia was inscribed as part of the UNESCO World Heritage Site "Syracuse and the Rocky Necropolis of Pantalica". The island represents the core of ancient Syracuse, showing continuous layers of Greek, Roman, and Byzantine, Arab, and Norman influences.

Ortygia’s urban layout, religious buildings, and public spaces reflect the political and religious evolution of the Mediterranean over more than two millennia. The island is considered a key component of the heritage designation, embodying both architectural and historical significance.

== Mythology ==
In Greek mythology, Ortygia is associated with several legends. According to the Homeric Hymn to Delian Apollo, the goddess Leto stopped at Ortygia to give birth to Artemis, who then assisted her mother to Delos, where Apollo was born. Other sources suggest the twins were born at either Delos or Ortygia, though Strabo identified Ortygia as an old name for Delos.

Some traditions link the island’s origin to Asteria, Leto’s sister, who transformed into a quail (Ortyx) and became the island.

Ortygia is also connected to the myth of Orion, who was abducted by Eos, the goddess of dawn, to the island and later joined Artemis’ retinue.

Finally, Ortygia is the legendary home of Arethusa, a nymph who, while fleeing the river god Alpheus, was transformed into a spring by Artemis. She emerged on Ortygia as the Fountain of Arethusa, providing water for the city.

== History ==
A small island just off the coast of Sicily, Ortygia naturally lent itself to use as a fortified settlement due to its harbors and defensible position. Its size allowed it to support a substantial population even in antiquity. Consequently, the history of Ortygia is closely intertwined with the early development of Syracuse.

The island was first settled by the ancient Sicels before the arrival of Greek colonists in the 8th century BCE, who established Syracuse as one of the most important cities of Magna Graecia. Ortygia became the religious and political center of the city, hosting major temples, markets, and public buildings. During the Roman period, the island continued to be a significant urban center, although political and economic activity gradually shifted to the mainland. Over the centuries, Ortygia has remained a vital part of Syracuse, preserving a rich architectural and cultural heritage from its Greek, Roman, Byzantine, and later medieval periods.

== Location ==
Ortygia is located at the eastern end of Syracuse and is separated from it by a narrow channel. Two bridges connect the island to mainland Sicily. The island is a popular location for tourists, shopping, entertainment and is also a residential area.

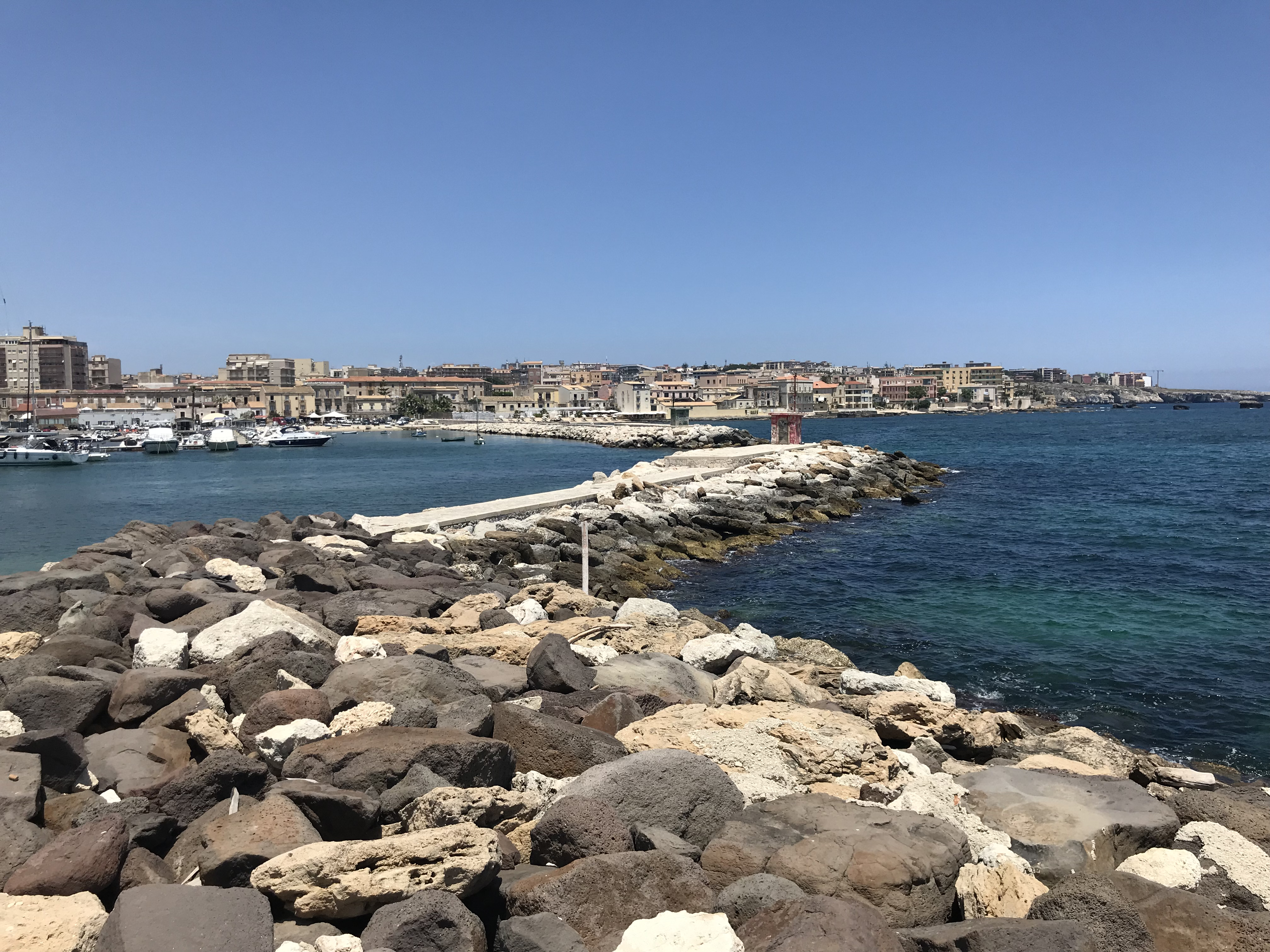
A Harbor at Ortygia

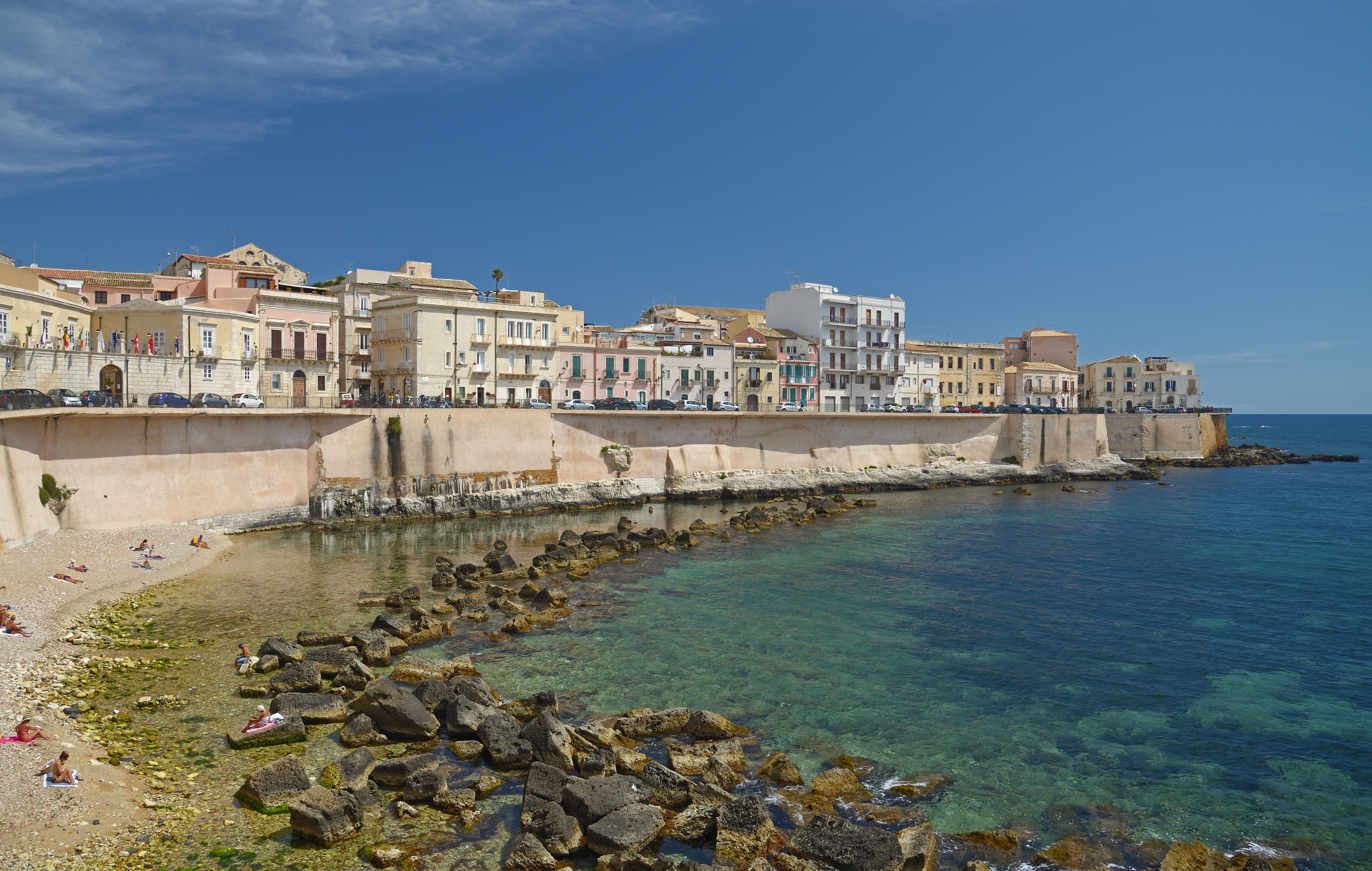
Lungomare di Ortigia

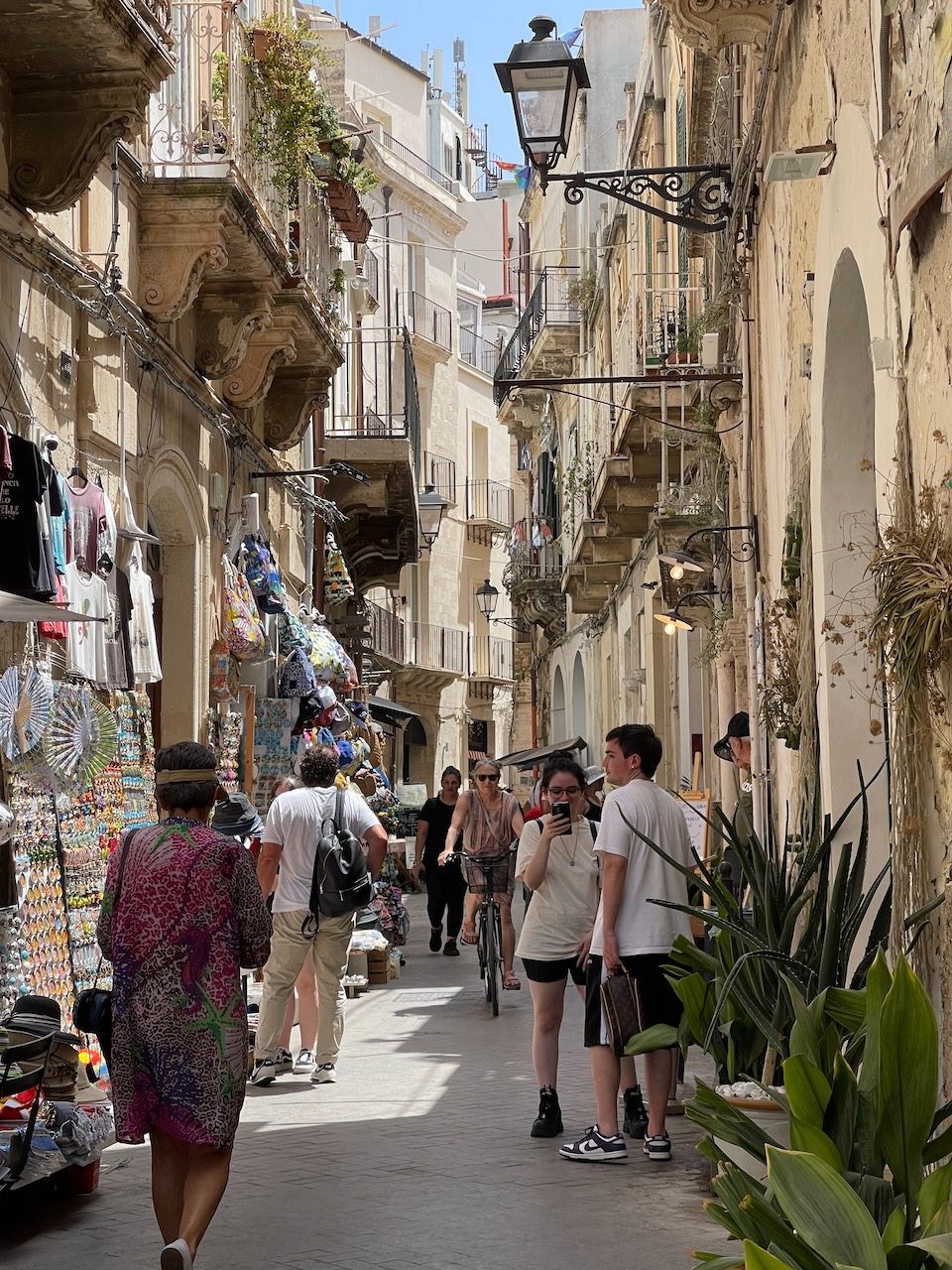
Via Saverio Landolina

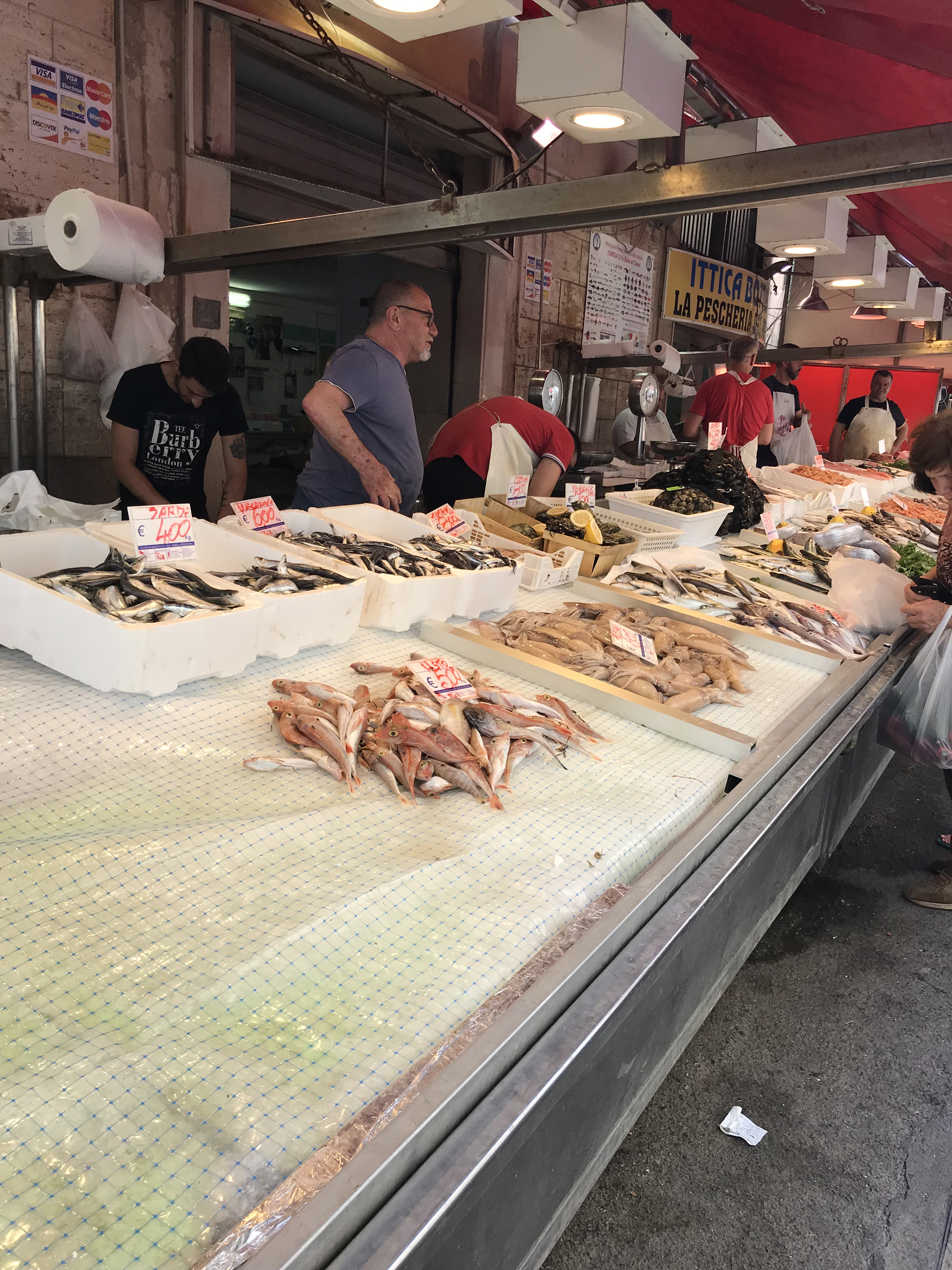
The Market at Ortygia

== Subdistricts ==
- Graziella (Sicilian: Razziedda)
- Bottari (Sicilian: 'Uttari)
- Mastrarua (Sicilian: Masciarrò)
- Spirduta (Sicilian: Spidduta)
- Maestranza (Sicilian: Mascianza)
- Duomo (Sicilian: Domu)
- Giudecca (Sicilian: Jureca)
- Turba (Sicilian: Tubba)
- Castello Maniace (Sicilian: Casteddu)

== Landmarks ==
- Cathedral of Syracuse – Built on the site of a Greek temple to Athena, the cathedral combines Norman, Gothic, and Baroque architectural elements.
- Castello Maniace – A 13th-century fortress at the tip of the island, built by Frederick II, Holy Roman Emperor as a defensive stronghold.
- Fountain of Arethusa – A freshwater spring linked to the myth of the nymph Arethusa, surrounded by papyrus and located on the seafront.
- Jewish Quarter (Giudecca) – A historic district of narrow streets and squares, reflecting the centuries-long presence of a Jewish community.
- Piazza Archimede – A square named after Archimedes, featuring fountains and statues, and serving as a local gathering place.
- Piazza del Duomo – The central square of Ortigia, lined with historic buildings, cafés, and churches.
- Temple of Apollo – One of Sicily’s oldest Doric temples, dating to the 6th century BCE.
- Fonte Aretusa promenade – A seafront walkway offering views of the sea, historic buildings, and outdoor cafés.

== See also ==
- Two Brothers Rocks
