= HMS Arethusa =

Eight ships of the Royal Navy have borne the name HMS Arethusa after the Greek mythological nymph Arethusa, who was transformed by Artemis into a fountain.

- HMS Arethusa (1759) was a 32-gun fifth-rate ship captured from the French Navy in 1759 and wrecked in 1779. Its Action of 17 June 1778 is the subject of the ballad: The Saucy Arethusa.
- HMS Arethusa (1781) was a 38-gun fifth-rate launched in 1781 and broken up in 1814.
- HMS Arethusa (1817) was a 46-gun fifth-rate launched in 1817, and renamed HMS Bacchus in 1844 upon her conversion into a hulk; she was broken up in 1883.
- HMS Arethusa (1849) was a 50-gun fourth-rate launched in 1849. She was fitted with screw propulsion in 1861 and became a training ship in 1874. She was broken up in 1934.
- HMS Arethusa (1882) was a Leander-class protected cruiser launched in 1882 and scrapped in 1905.
- HMS Arethusa (1913) was an Arethusa-class light cruiser launched in 1913 and wrecked after being damaged by a naval mine in 1916.
- HMS Arethusa (26) was an Arethusa-class light cruiser launched in 1934 and scrapped in 1950.
- HMS Arethusa (F38) was a Leander-class frigate launched in 1963 and sunk as training target in 1991.

== Battle honours ==
- Ushant 1778 & 1781
- St Lucia 1796
- Curaçao 1807
- Black Sea 1854
- China 1900
- Heligoland 1914
- Dogger Bank 1915
- Norway 1940-41
- Malta Convoys 1941-42
- Normandy 1944

== See also ==
- HMS Arethuse
