= 95 Arethusa =

Main-belt asteroid

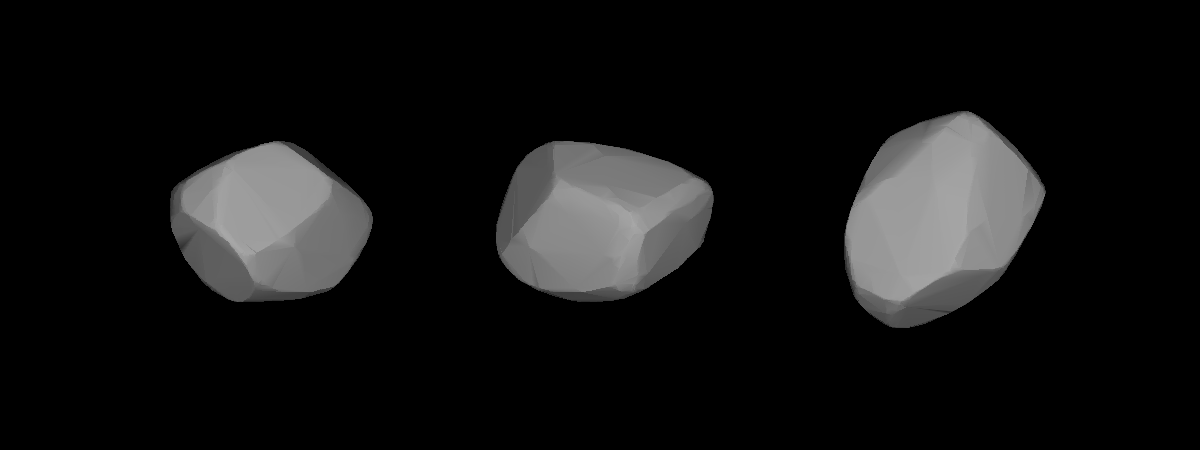
- A three-dimensional model of 95 Arethusa based on its lightcurve

Discovery
- Discovered by: Karl Theodor Robert Luther
- Discovery date: 23 November 1867

Designations
- Pronunciation: /ærəˈθjuːsə/
- Minor planet category: Main belt
- Adjectives: Arethusian, Arethusean /ˌærəˈθjuːziən/

Orbital characteristics
- Epoch 31 July 2016 (JD 2457600.5)
- Uncertainty parameter 0
- Observation arc: 143.53 yr (52424 d)
- Aphelion: 3.53176 AU (528.344 Gm)
- Perihelion: 2.59737 AU (388.561 Gm)
- Semi-major axis: 3.06457 AU (458.453 Gm)
- Eccentricity: 0.15245
- Orbital period (sidereal): 5.36 yr (1959.5 d)
- Average orbital speed: 16.91 km/s
- Mean anomaly: 250.185°
- Mean motion: 0° 11^{m} 1.385^{s} / day
- Inclination: 12.9955°
- Longitude of ascending node: 243.038°
- Argument of perihelion: 154.196°

Physical characteristics
- Mean diameter: 147 ± 32 km
- Mass: (2.97±0.33)×10^{18} kg (Note: Calculated from its standard gravitational parameter GM = 0.198±0.022 km^{3}/s^{2}.)
- Mean density: 1.78±1.18 g/cm^{3} (calculated)
- Equatorial surface gravity: 0.037 m/s^{2} (0.0038 g_{0})
- Equatorial escape velocity: 73 m/s
- Synodic rotation period: 8.70221 h (0.362592 d)
- Pole ecliptic longitude: 149°
- Pole ecliptic latitude: 33°
- Geometric albedo: 0.0698±0.012; 0.070
- Spectral type: C
- Absolute magnitude (H): 8.0

95 Arethusa is a large main-belt asteroid. It was discovered by German astronomer Robert Luther on 23 November 1867, and named after one of the various Arethusas in Greek mythology. Arethusa has been observed occulting a star three times: first on 2 February 1998, and twice in January 2003.

This object is orbiting the Sun with a period of 5.36 years and an eccentricity of 0.15. The cross-section diameter is around 136 km and it is spinning with a rotation period of 8.7 hours. The spectrum matches a C-type asteroid, indicating a dark surface with a primitive carbonaceous composition.
