= Arethusa (painting) =

Painting by Benjamin West

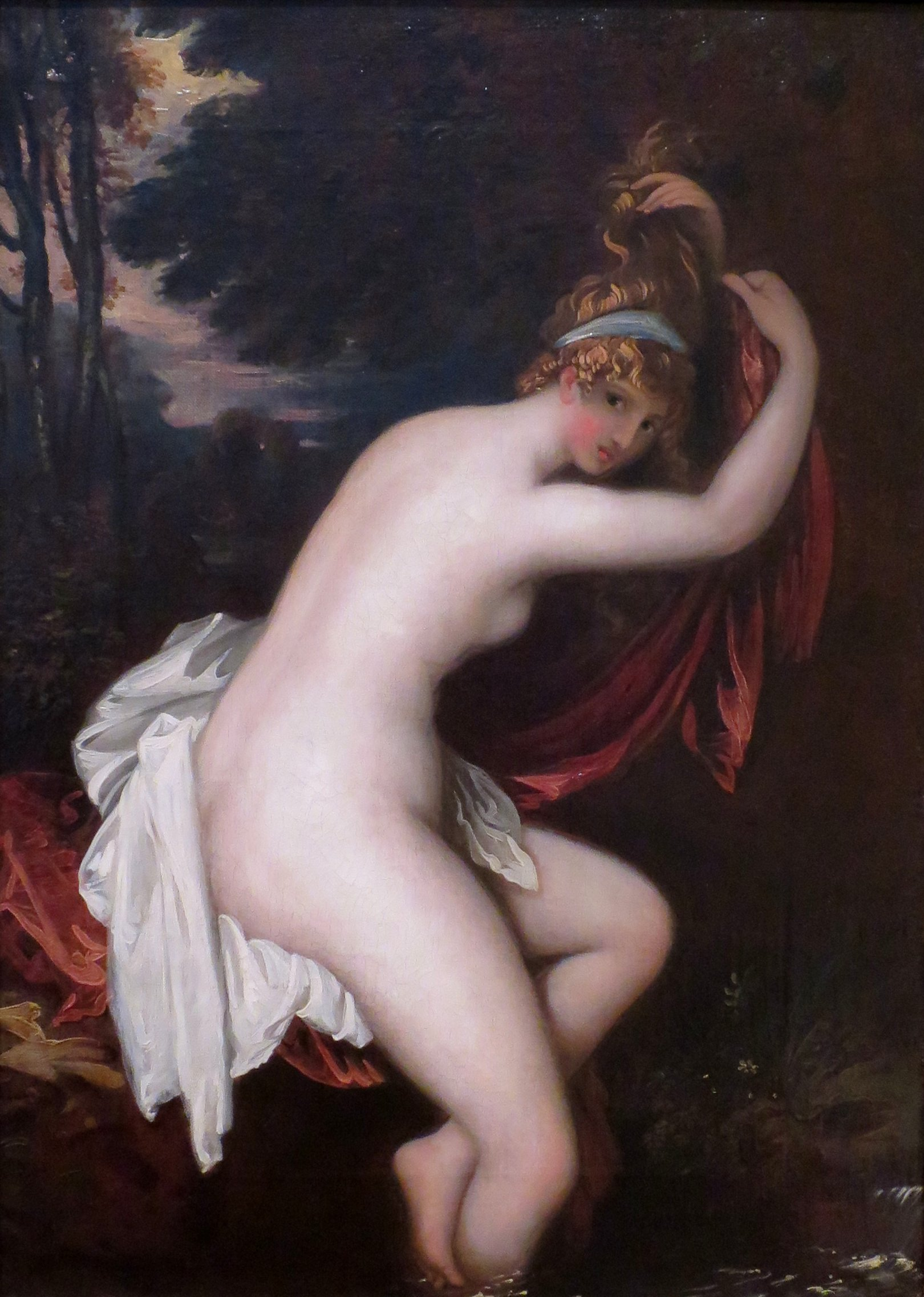
- Artist: Benjamin West
- Year: 1802
- Type: Oil on canvas
- Dimensions: 54.5 cm × 40 cm (21.5 in × 16 in)
- Location: High Museum of Art, Atlanta

Arethusa is an 1802 history painting by the American-born British artist Benjamin West. It features a nude scene of Arethusa, a figure from Greek mythology. A nymph, she was the chaste attendant of the Goddess of Love Artemis. Inspired by Ovid's Metamorphoses it shows her disturbed while bathing in a stream by the river god Alpheus. While he pursued her, she escaped by transforming herself into a fountain. She is shown with bright copper-coloured hair

The painting was displayed at the Royal Academy Exhibition of 1802 at Somerset House in London, when West was serving as President of the Royal Academy. Today it is in the collection of the High Museum of Art in Atlanta, Georgia. West had painted a similar theme in his 1795 picture Musidora and Her Two Companions.

== Bibliography ==
- Alberts, Robert C. Benjamin West: A Biography. Houghton Mifflin, 1978.
- Ayres, Brenda & Maier, Sarah E. Vindication of the Redhead: The Typology of Red Hair Throughout the Literary and Visual Arts. Springer International, 2021.
- Clubbe, John. Byron, Sully, and the Power of Portraiture. Taylor and Francis, 2017.
- Dillenberger, John. Benjamin West. Trinity University Press, 1977
- Grossman, Lloyd. Benjamin West and the Struggle to be Modern. Merrell Publishers, 2015.
