= Fountain of Arethusa =

Sicilian natural fountain that features in mythology and literature

Coordinates: 37°3′26.12″N 15°17′34.48″E

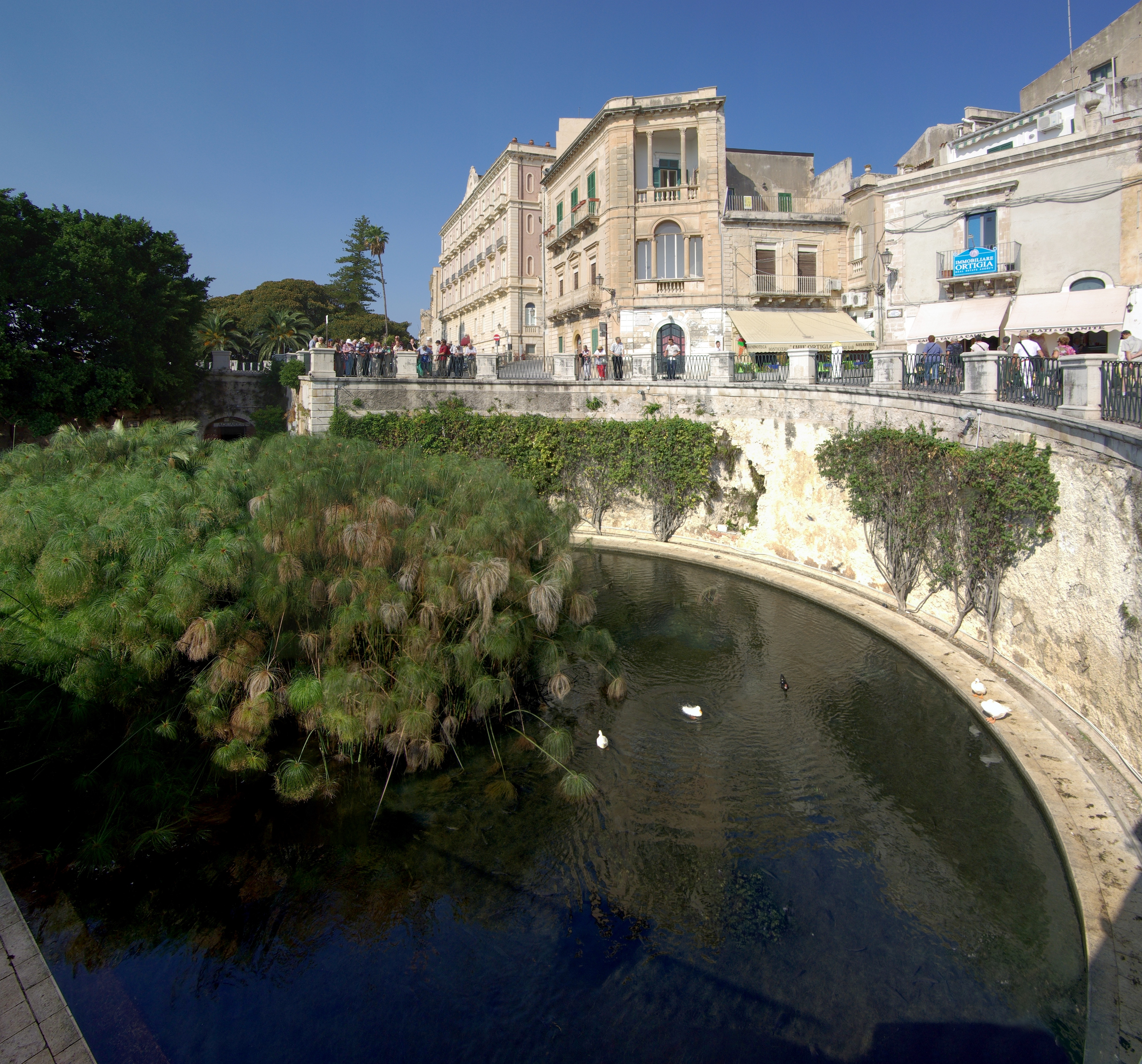
The Fountain of Arethusa with papyrus plants

The Fountain of Arethusa (Italian: Fonte Aretusa, Ancient Greek: Ἀρέθουσα) is a natural spring on the island of Ortygia in the historical centre of the city of Syracuse in Sicily. According to Greek mythology, this freshwater fountain is the place where the nymph Arethusa, the patron figure of ancient Syracuse, returned to Earth's surface after escaping from her undersea home in Arcadia.

The fountain is considered one of the most emblematic landmarks of ancient Syracuse and is included within the boundaries of the designated World Heritage area due to its historical, mythological, and cultural significance.

The fountain is mentioned in a number of works of literature, for instance John Milton's pastoral elegy Lycidas (l. 85) and his masque Arcades, as well as Alexander Pope's satire The Dunciad (Bk 2, l. 342) and William Wordsworth's blank verse poem The Prelude (Bk X, l. 1033). These writers would have known the fountain from references in ancient Roman and Greek sources, such as Virgil's 10th Eclogue (l. 1) and Theocritus' pastoral poem Idylls (I, l. 117). Virgil reckons the eponymous nymph as the divinity who inspired bucolic or pastoral poetry. In Moby-Dick, Herman Melville writes that waters from the fountain were said to come from the Holy Land.

The Fountain of Arethusa, the river Ciane, south of Syracuse, and the river Fiume Freddo in the province of Catania are the only places in Europe where papyrus grows.

The Fountain of Arethusa at night

Currently, the fountain is one of the most-visited sites in Syracuse. The Fountain of Arethusa and Saint Lucy are considered the two symbols and patrons of the city, represented in the motto City of Water and Light.
