= Aréthuse-class submarine =

French Navy attack submarine class (1958–1982)

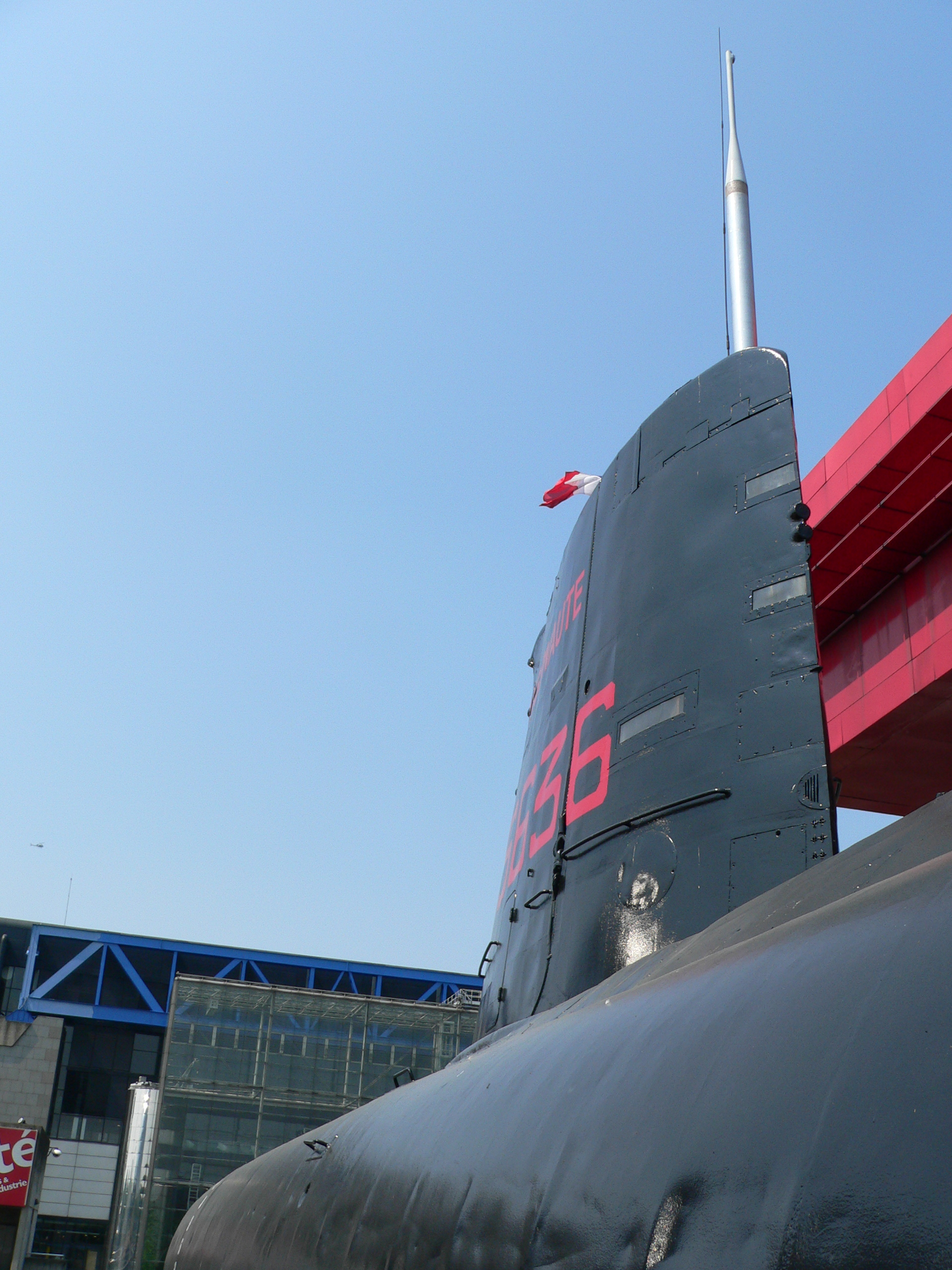
- The conning tower of Argonaute

Class overview
- Name: Aréthuse class
- Operators: French Navy
- Preceded by: Narval class
- Succeeded by: Daphné class
- In service: 1958–1982
- Completed: 4
- Retired: 4
- Preserved: 1

General characteristics
- Type: Submarine
- Displacement: 552 t (543 long tons) surfaced; 680 t (669 long tons) submerged
- Length: 49.6 m (162 ft 9 in)
- Beam: 5.8 m (19 ft 0 in)
- Draught: 4 m (13 ft 1 in)
- Propulsion: 1 shaft; 2 × 12-cylinder SEMT Pielstick diesel engines 790 kW (1,060 bhp); 1 electric motor 970 kW (1,300 hp)
- Speed: 12.5 knots (23.2 km/h; 14.4 mph) surfaced; 16 knots (30 km/h; 18 mph) submerged
- Complement: 40
- Sensors & processing systems: DUUA I sonar
- Armament: 4 × 550 mm (21.7 in) torpedo tubes (8 torpedoes carried)

The Aréthuse class were submarines built for the French Navy (French: Marine Nationale) in the 1950s. They were designed as attack submarines for anti-submarine warfare and were referred to as Sous-marins de Chasse by the French Navy. These submarines had advanced sensors and were very quiet. They were influenced by the World War II German Type XXIII U-boats. The Daphné class are an enlarged version built for the French, Pakistani, Portuguese, Spanish and South African navies.

== Description ==
Designated Sous-marins de Chasse by the French Navy the Aréthuse class were designed as attack submarines specifically for operations in the Mediterranean Sea. The design was influenced by the German World War II Type XXIII U-boats, though were larger, with a heavier armament and faster when submerged but retained a small silhouette and great manoeverability. They had a standard displacement of 410 tonnes (400 long tons), 552 t (543 long tons) surfaced and 680 t (669 long tons) submerged. Vessels of the class were 49.6 metres (162 ft 9 in) long with a beam of 5.8 m (19 ft 0 in) and a draught of 4 m (13 ft 1 in). The Aréthuse class were the first French submarines to use a diesel-electric propulsion system and were powered by two 12-cylinder SEMT Pielstick diesel engines driving one shaft rated at 790 kilowatts (1,060 bhp) surfaced. They also mounted two electric generators that produced 337 kW (452 hp) connected to one electric motor for use while submerged rated at 970 kW (1,300 hp). The generators were placed on spring suspensions and the motor was attached directly to the shaft creating a near-silent operational environment while submerged. The submarines had a maximum speed of 12.5 knots (23.2 km/h; 14.4 mph) surfaced and 16 knots (30 km/h; 18 mph) submerged.

Aréthuse-class submarines were armed with four torpedo tubes in the bow for four 550 mm (21.7 in) torpedoes. The submarines carried four reloads. They were designed primarily for anti-submarine warfare. They were equipped with DUUA I sonar. The Aréthuse-class submarines had a complement of 40 including 6 officers. By 1981, their sonar had been upgraded to one active DUUA II sonar, one passive DUUA II sonar, one passive ranging DUUX 2 sonar. They had a diving depth down to roughly 182.8 metres (600 ft).

== Ships ==
Aréthuse class
Name	Hull no.	Builder	Launched	Completed	Decommissioned
Aréthuse	S 635	Arsenal de Cherbourg, Cherbourg, France	9 November 1957	23 October 1958	April 1979
Argonaute	S 636	Arsenal de Cherbourg, Cherbourg, France	29 June 1957	11 February 1959	1982 preserved as a museum in the Cité des Sciences et de l'Industrie Paris
Amazone	S 639	Arsenal de Cherbourg, Cherbourg, France	3 April 1958	1 July 1959	July 1980
Ariane	S 640	Arsenal de Cherbourg, Cherbourg, France	12 September 1958	16 March 1960	March 1981

== Service history ==
Two submarines, Aréthuse and Argonaute, were ordered as part of the 1953 construction programme, and the last two, Amazone and Ariane, were ordered as part of the 1954 programme. All four submarines were constructed at the Arsenal de Cherbourg in Cherbourg, France. The first two were laid down in March 1955, and the last two in December. By 1960 all four submarines had entered service and operated exclusively in the Mediterranean Sea as a deterrent against threats to commercial shipping between France and its colonies in North Africa. On 14 March 1979, Aréthuse was taken out of service and placed in reserve. Amazone followed in June 1980 and Ariane in March 1981. Argonaute was taken out of service in 1982. Argonaute was transferred to Paris to become a museum exhibit in 1989. The design of the French Daphné class was based on the Aréthuse class.

== See also ==
Equivalent submarines of the same era

- Hajen class
- Type 205
- Toti class
- Natsushio class
