= Arethusa (nymph) =

Nymph of Greek mythology

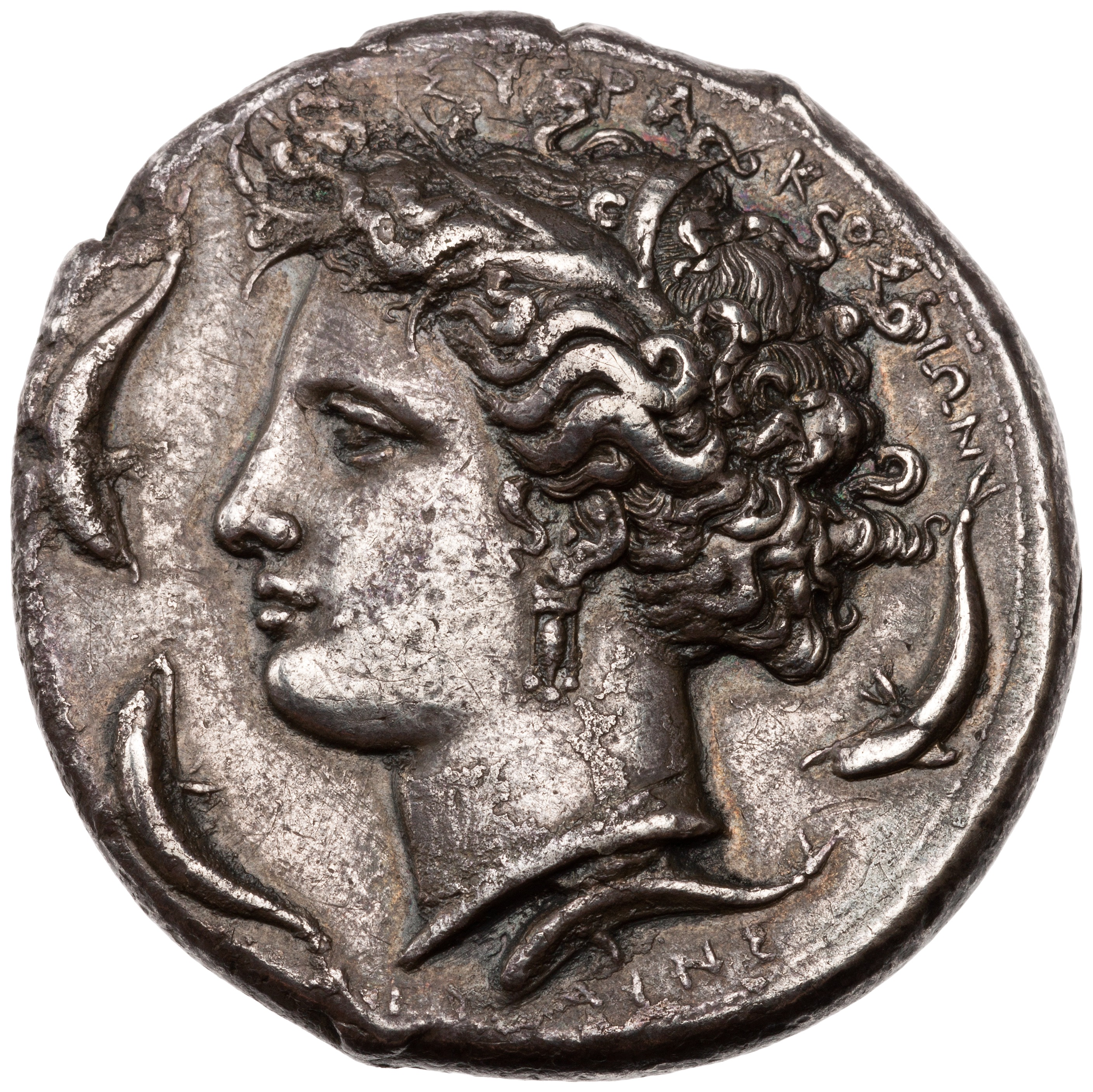
Silver decadrachm of Arethusa, minted in Syracuse, Sicily (405–400 BCE)

In Greek mythology, Arethusa (/ˌærɪˈθjuːzə/; Ancient Greek: Ἀρέθουσα) was a nymph who fled from her home in Arcadia beneath the sea and came up as a fresh water fountain on the island of Ortygia in Syracuse, Sicily.

== Mythology ==
The myth of her transformation begins in Arcadia when she came across a clear stream and began bathing, not knowing it was the river god Alpheus, who flowed down from Arcadia through Elis to the sea. He fell in love with her during their encounter, but she fled after discovering his presence and intentions, as she wished to remain a chaste attendant of Artemis. After a long chase, she prayed to her goddess to ask for protection. Artemis hid her in a cloud, but Alpheus was persistent. She began to perspire profusely from fear, and soon transformed into a stream. Artemis then broke the ground allowing Arethusa another attempt to flee. Her stream traveled under the sea to the island of Ortygia, but Alpheus flowed through the sea to reach her and mingle with her waters. Virgil augurs for Arethusa a salt-free passage beneath the sea on the condition that, before departing, she grant him songs about troubled loves, not those in her own future, but those of Virgil's friend and contemporary, the poet Cornelius Gallus, whom Virgil imagines dying from unrequited love beneath the famous mountains of Arcadia, Maenalus and Lycaeus. During Demeter's search for her daughter Persephone, Arethusa entreated Demeter to discontinue her punishment of Sicily for her daughter's disappearance. She told the goddess that while traveling in her stream below the earth, she saw her daughter as the queen of Hades.

The Roman writer Ovid called Arethusa by the name "Alpheias", because her stream was believed to have a subterranean communication with the river Alpheius, in Peloponnesus. A legend of the period, still told in Sicily today, is that a wooden cup tossed into the River Alpheius will reappear in the Fountain of Arethusa in Syracuse.

The Arethusa myth became popular again in the Renaissance and particularly in Romanticism, retold by artists such as the sculptor Battista Lorenzi, painter Leopold Burthe, and poets Percy Bysshe Shelley and John Keats. Increasingly, the Arethusa myth was reimagined as a pastoral or love story set in Arcadia. Retellings have continued into the modern era. Anne Ridler's "Evenlode" (1959), which she described as "a fable of rivers designed for broadcasting with music," has Alpheus and Arethusa as its main characters.

== Coin of Arethusa ==
As a patron figure of Syracuse, the head of Arethusa surrounded by dolphins was a usual type on their coins. They are regarded as among the most famous and beautiful Ancient Greek coins. The Cook Islands issued three commemorative coins in 2023 depicting Arethusa with two dolphins near the rim on either style, in the style of the ancient originals.

== In music ==
Karol Szymanowski, Polish classical music composer, named "The Fountain of Arethusa" first of his three poems entitled "Myths" for violin and piano. The Saucy Arethusa is an 18th-century song about a British naval ship named after Arethusa. A movement of Benjamin Britten's oboe piece Six Metamorphoses After Ovid is entitled "Arethusa." Italian composer Ottorino Respighi composed a tone poem titled "Aretusa".

Also Ralph Vaughan Williams, the English classical music composer, composed "Sea Songs", a quick march for both brass band and wind band written in 1923, used a Morris Dance tune 'The Royal Princess' which was also known by the title 'The Arethusa', alongside two other shanty tunes 'Admiral Benbow' and 'Portsmouth'.

'The Princess Royal' is one of the most celebrated of Turlough O'Carolan's compositions, largely because of its association with the words of the song 'The Aretusa', to which it was set by Shield toward the end of the eighteenth century. The song of 'The Aretusa' originally appeared in a small opera or musical entertainment called 'The Lock and Key', which was acted in 1796. The Princess Royal was composed for the eldest daughter in Carolan's time of The MacDermott Roe of Coolavin. (There is also an English folk tune, of fairly wide distribution in England, which is entitled 'The Princess Royal' but has no connection with Carolan's melody.)

== Gallery ==
=== Arethusa and Alpheus ===
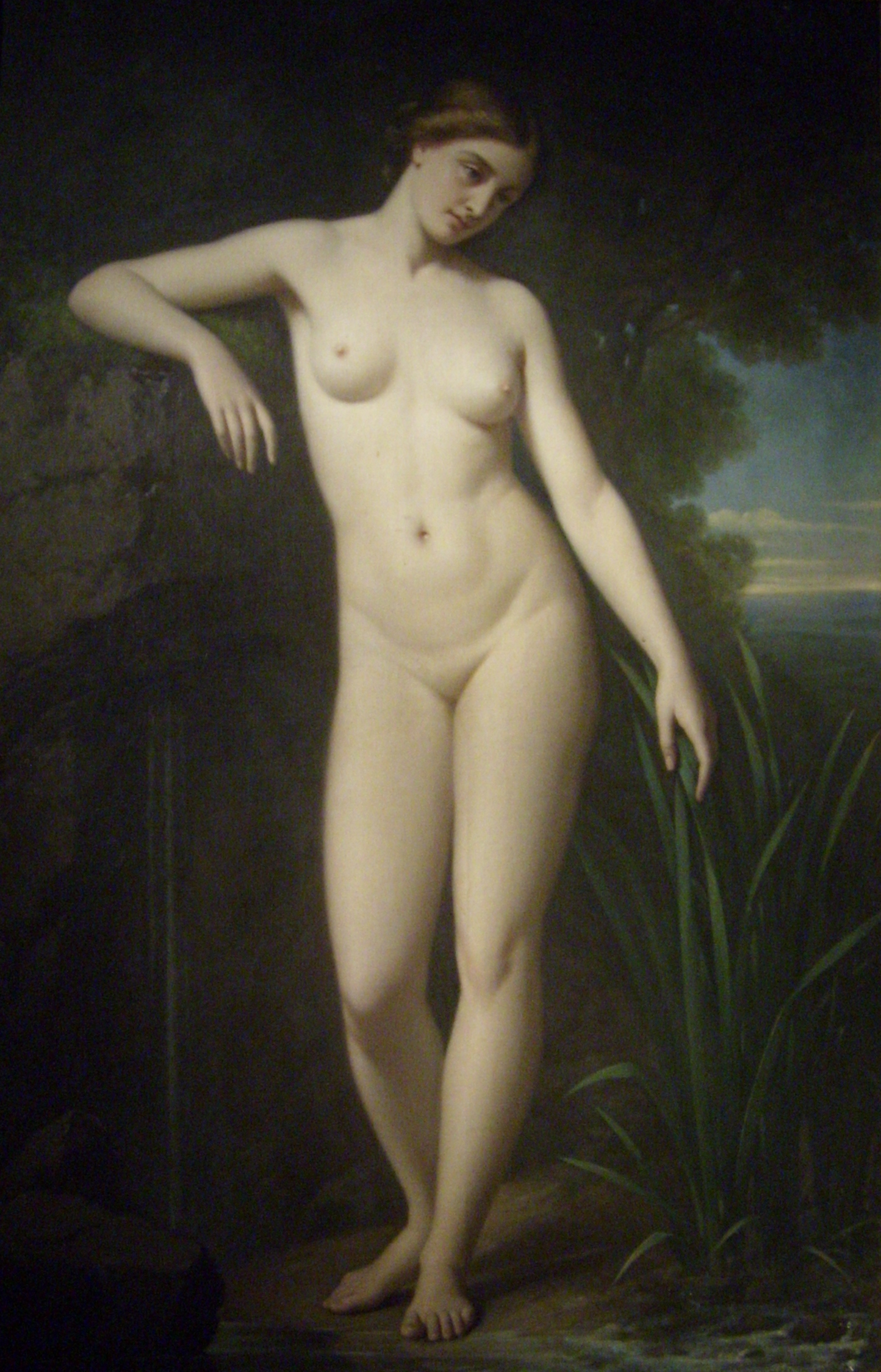
Aréthuse by Auguste François Jean Baptiste Legras (Salon 1874)

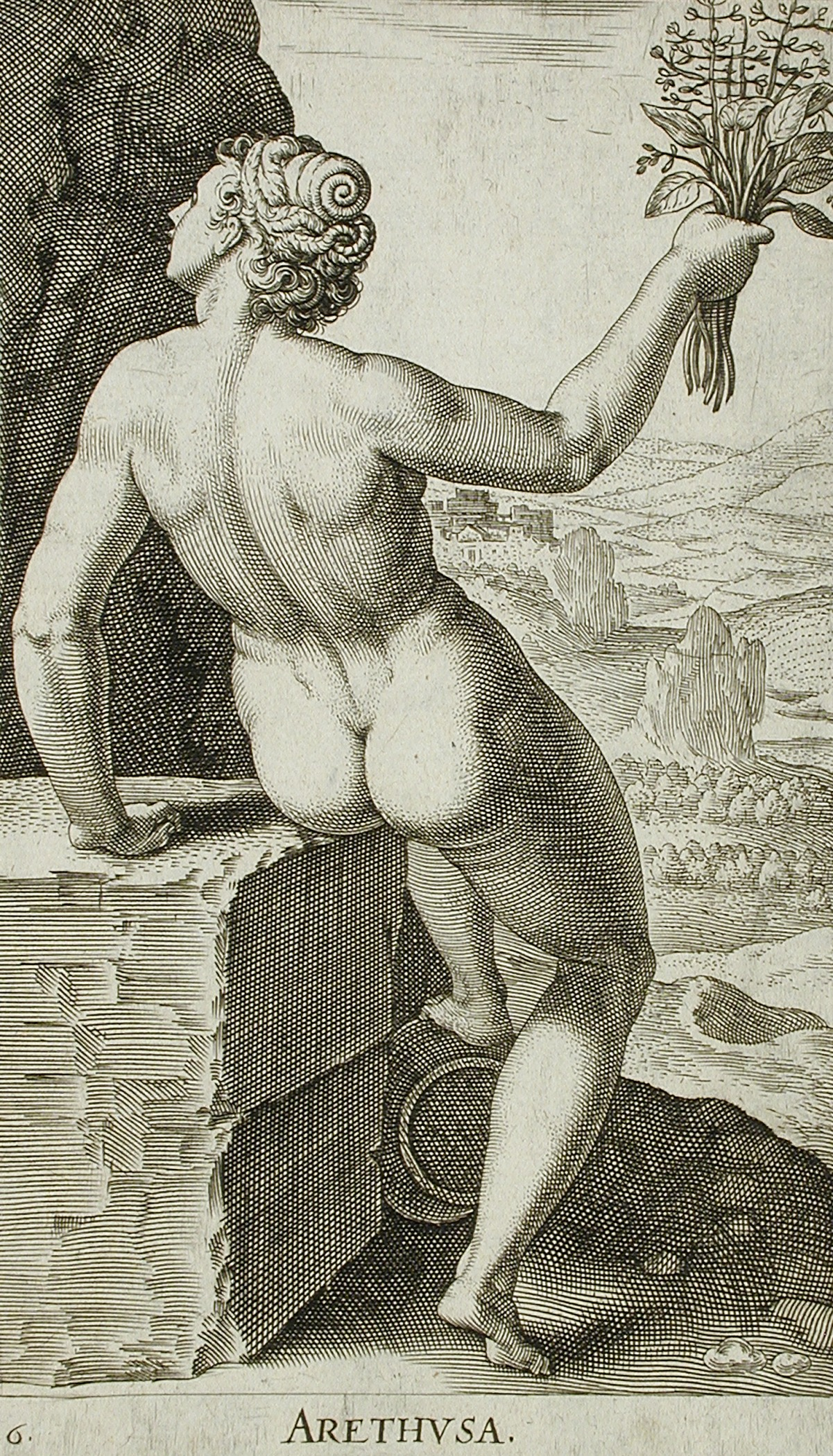
Arethusa by Philip Galle (1587)

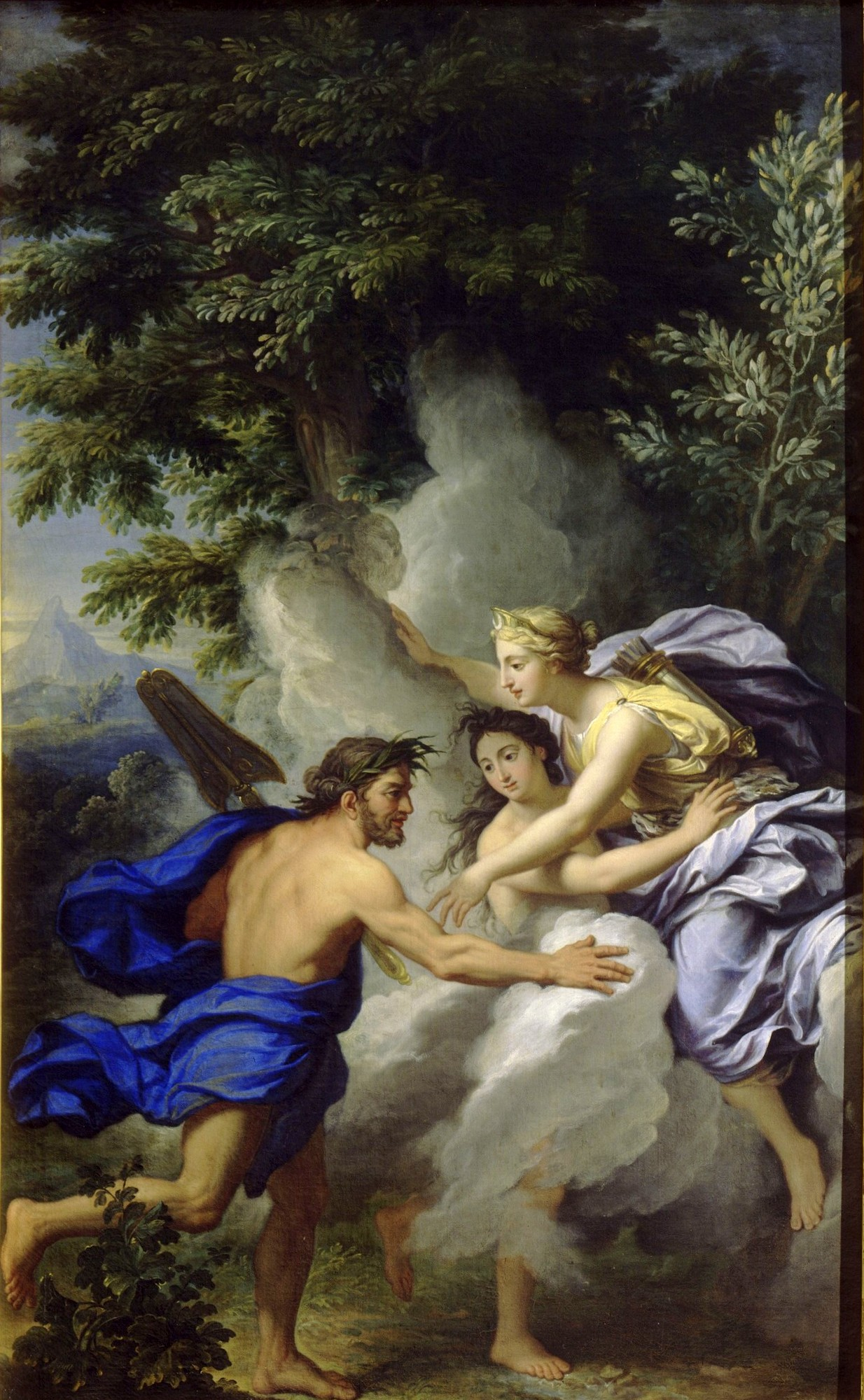
Alpheus and Arethusa by René-Antoine Houasse

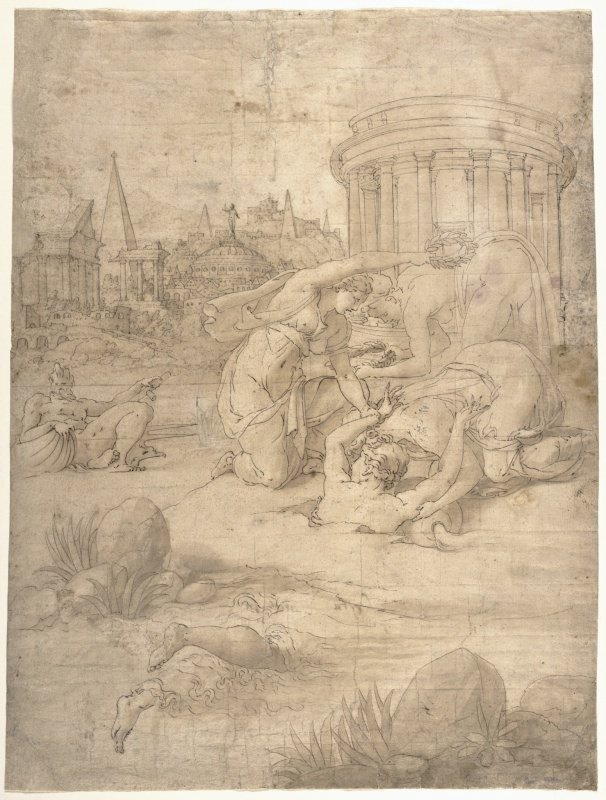
The Story of Arethusa by Francesco Primaticcio

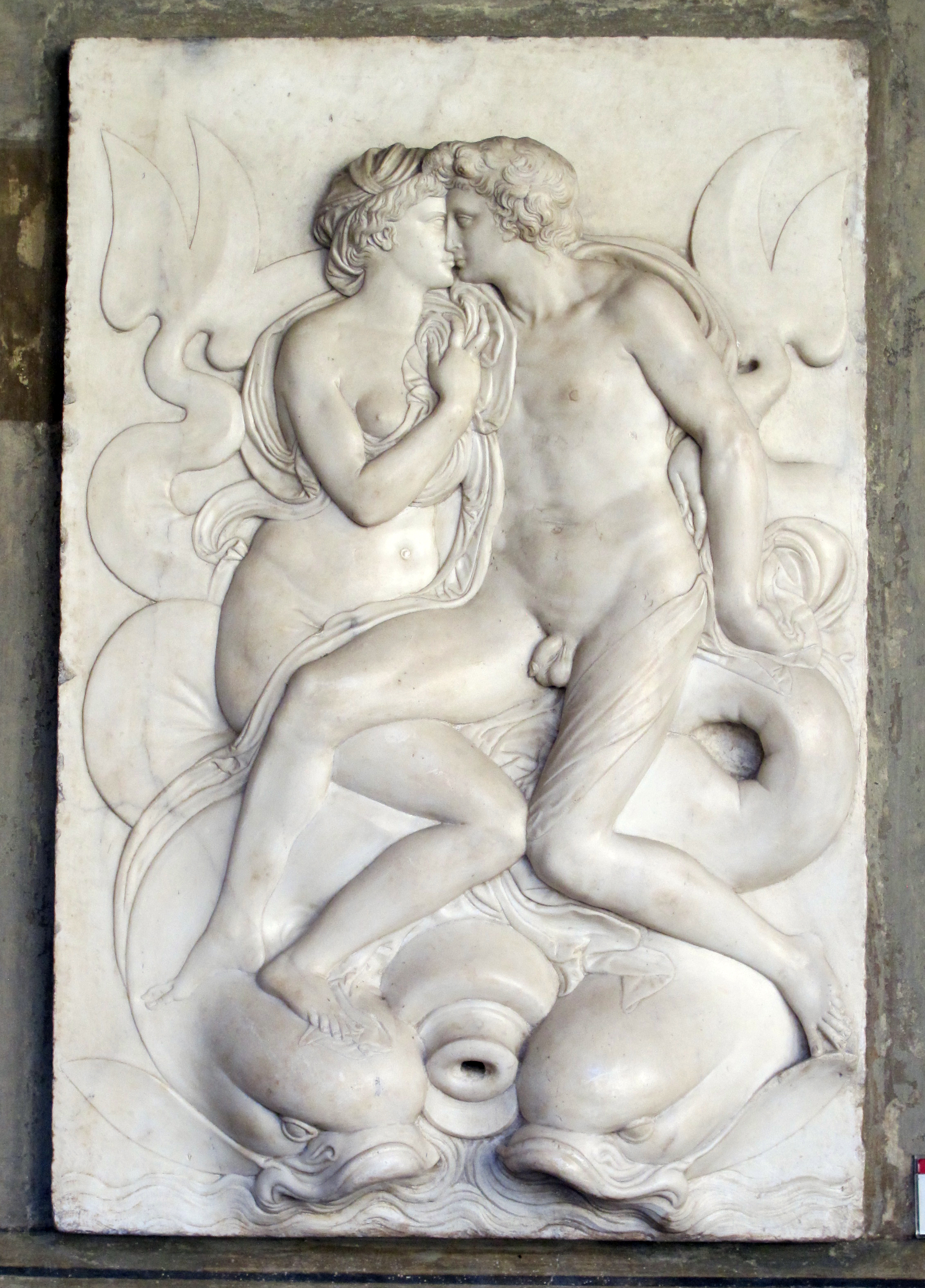
Scultore fiorentino, alfeo e aretusa, 1561–62

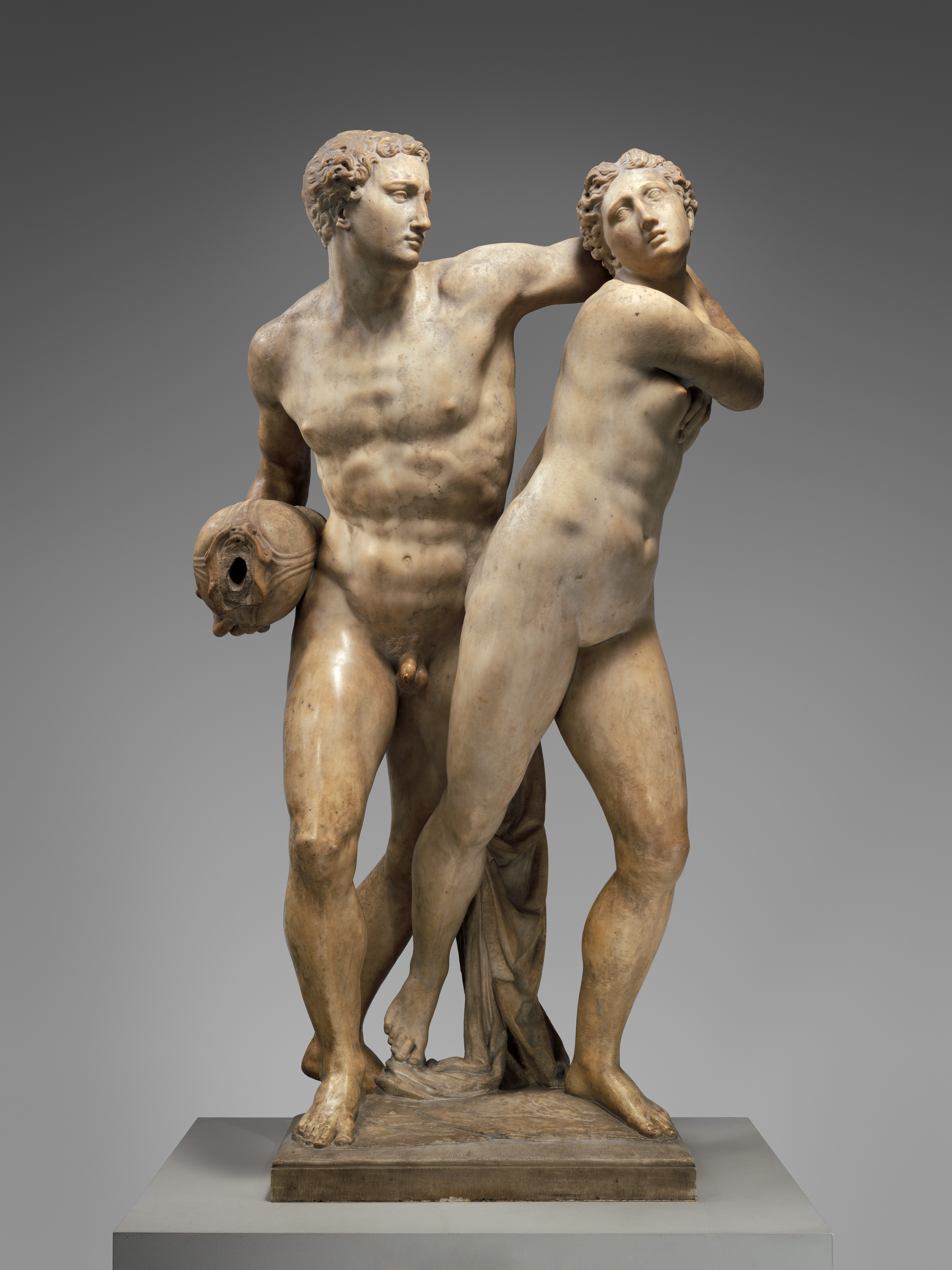
Alpheus and Arethusa by Battista di Domenico Lorenzi (1568–70)

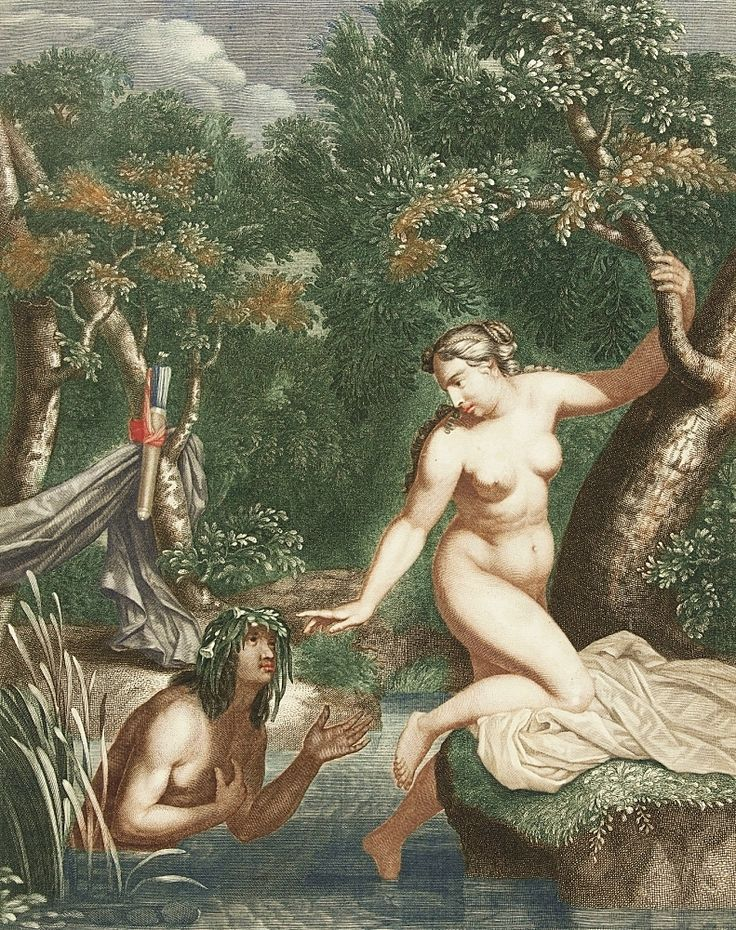
Alpheus and Arethusa by Abraham Bloteling (between 1655 and 1690)

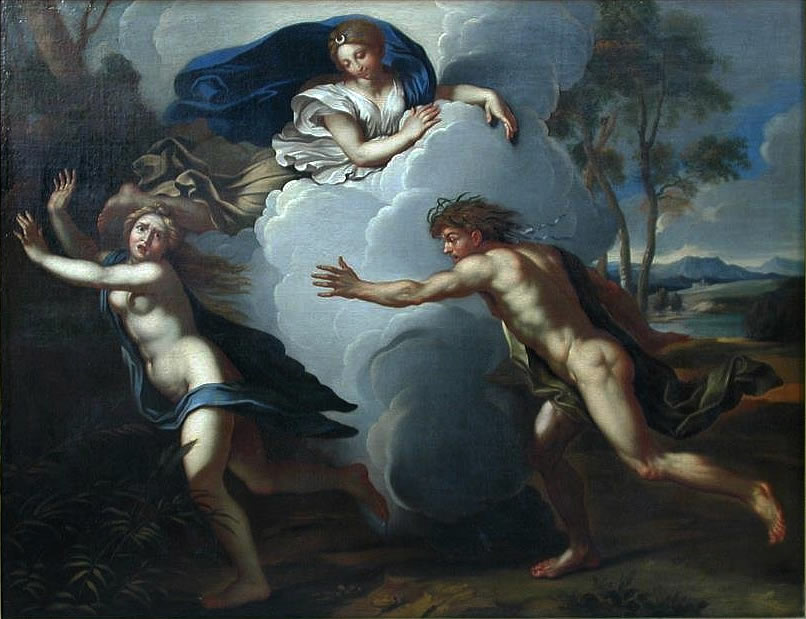
Alpheus and Arethusa (Roman School, circa 1640)

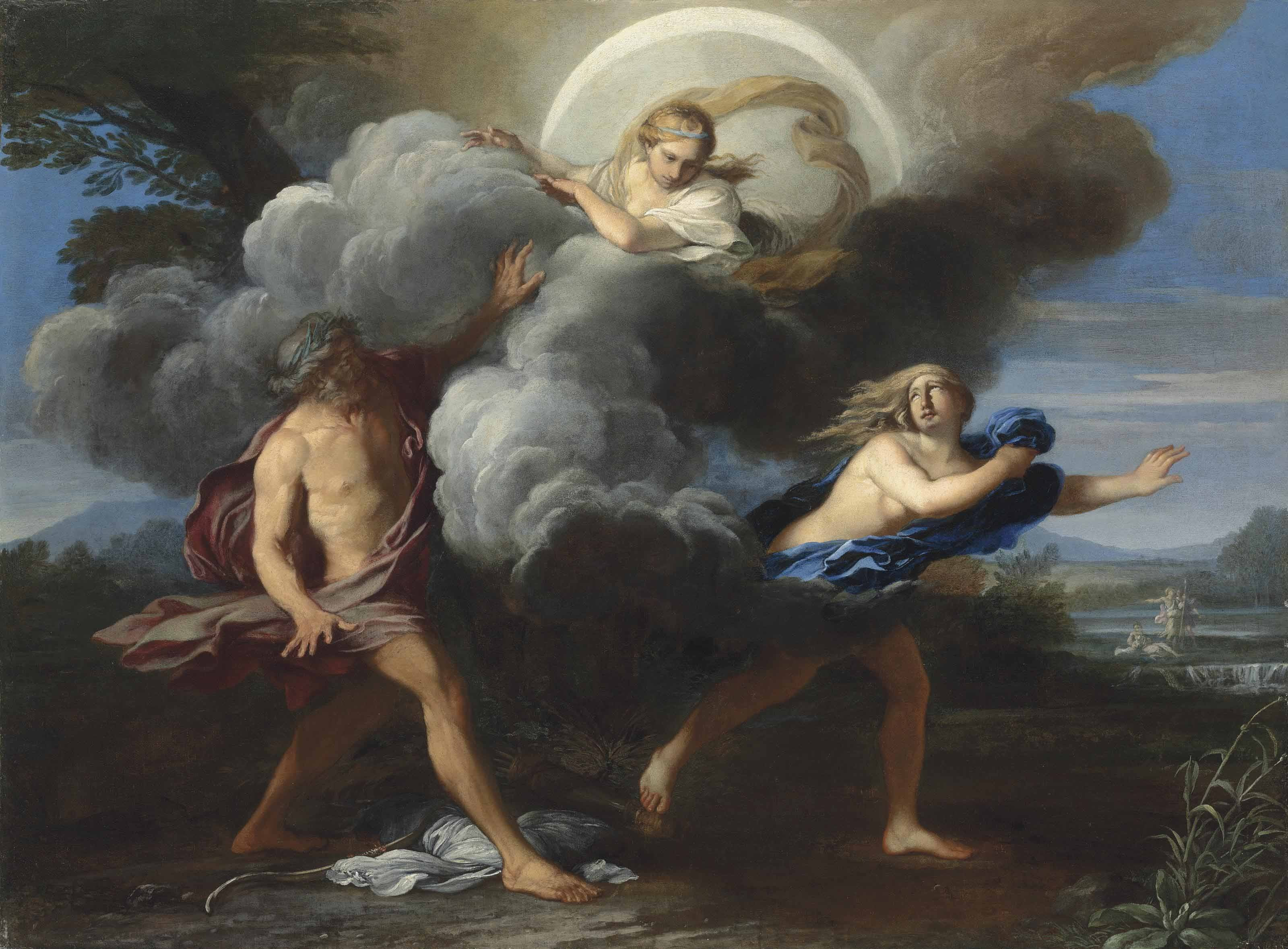
Alpheus and Arethusa by Carlo Maratta (7th-century)

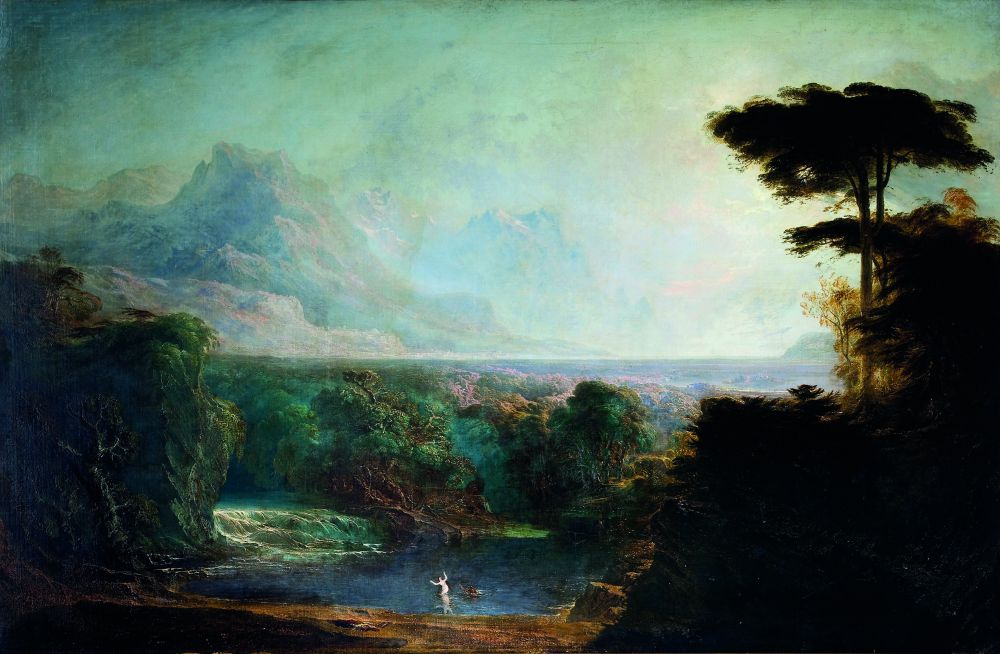
Alpheus and Arethusa by John Martin (1832)

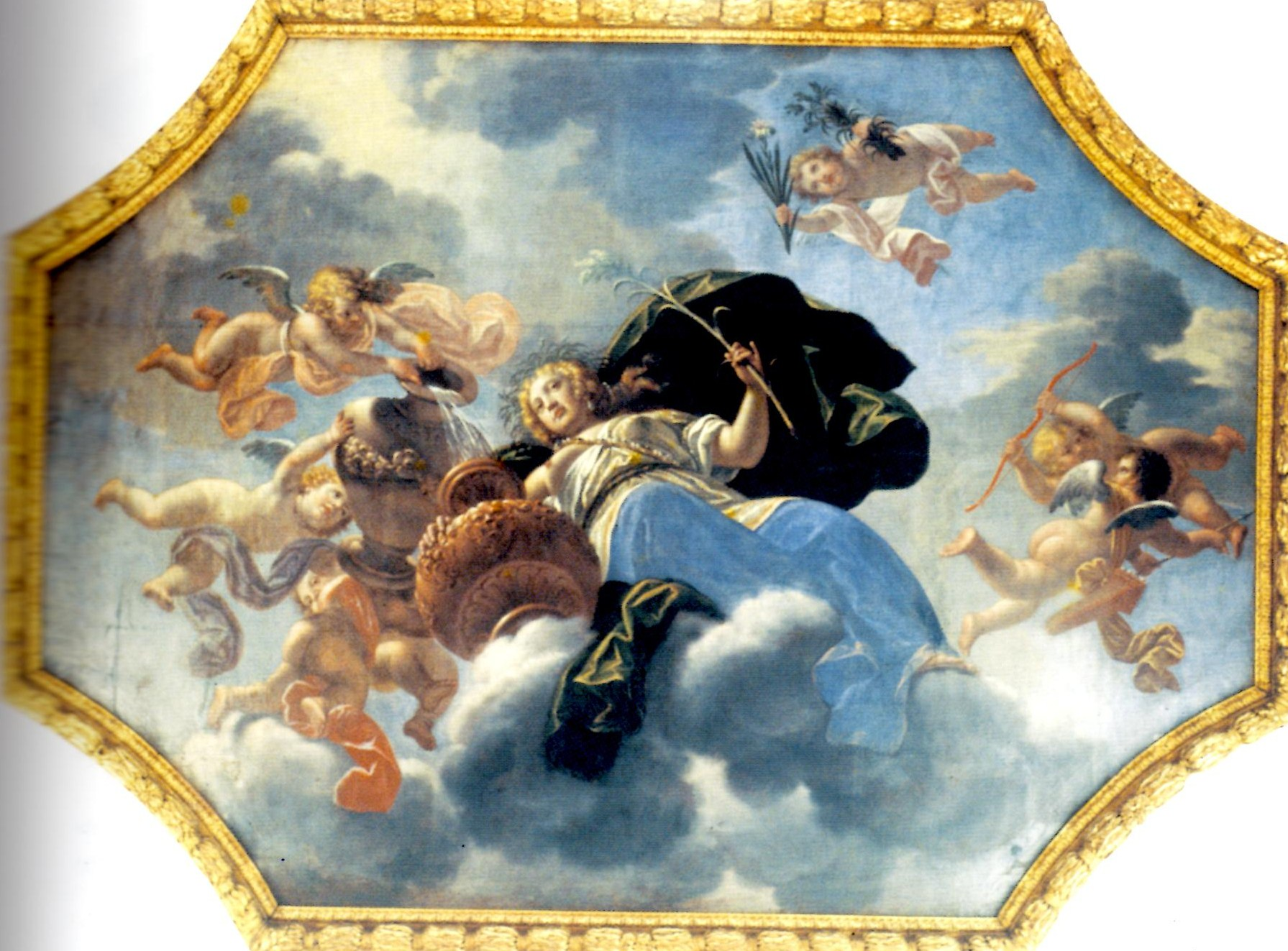
Aretusa by Antonio Triva (17th century)

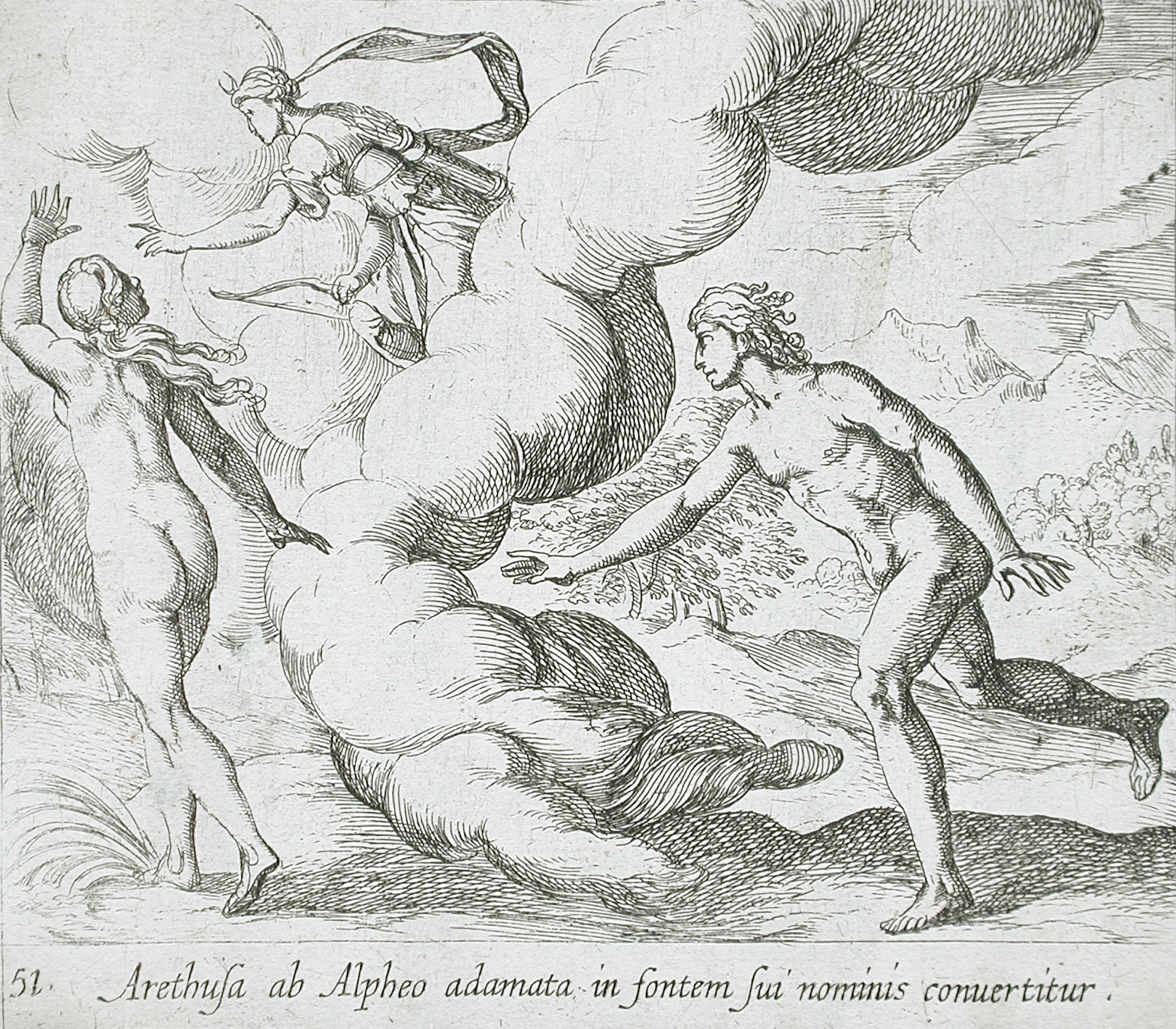
Arethusa Chased by Alpheus by Wilhelm Janson and Antonio Tempesta (1606)

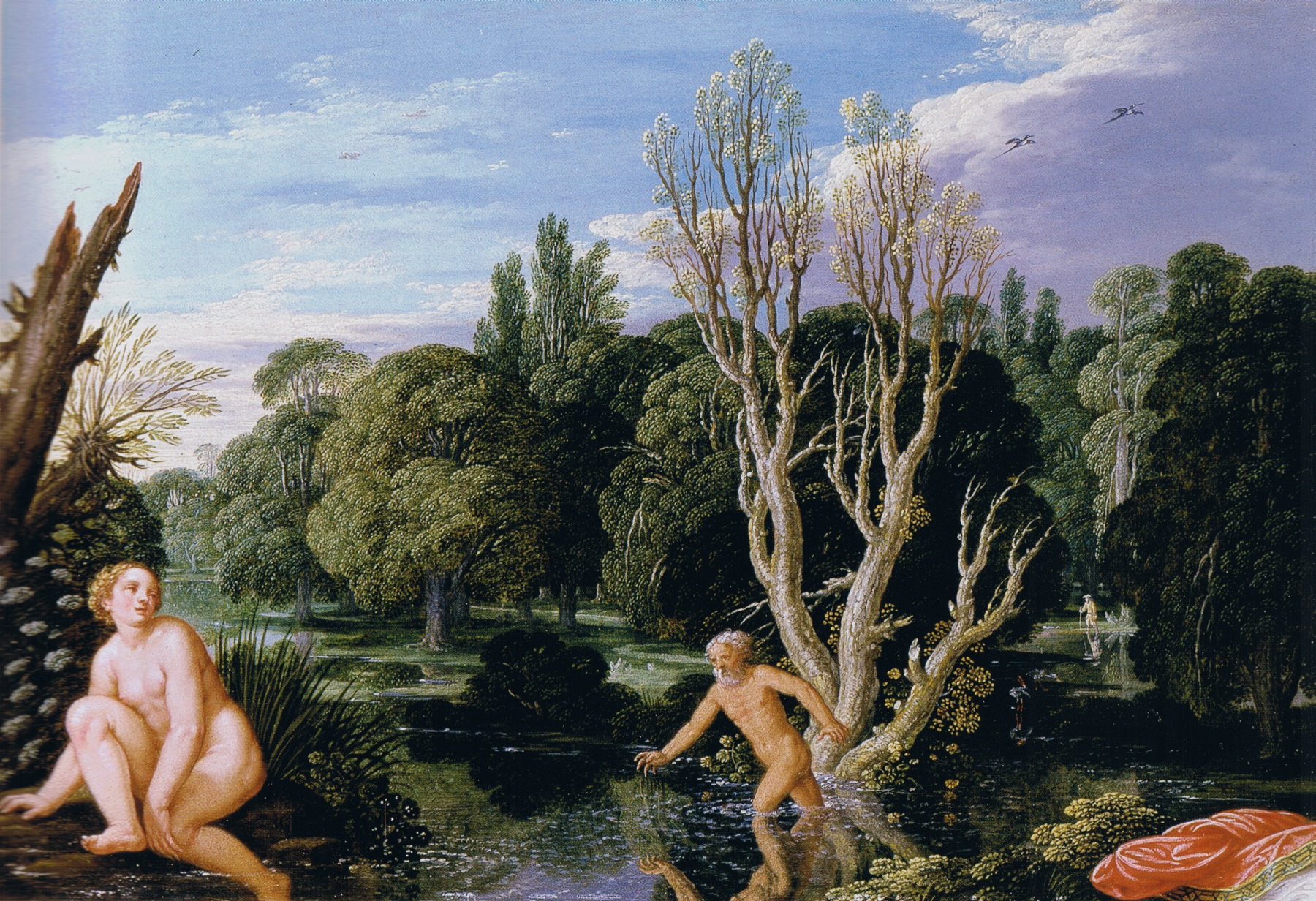
Alpheus and Arethusa by Johann König (probably 1610s)

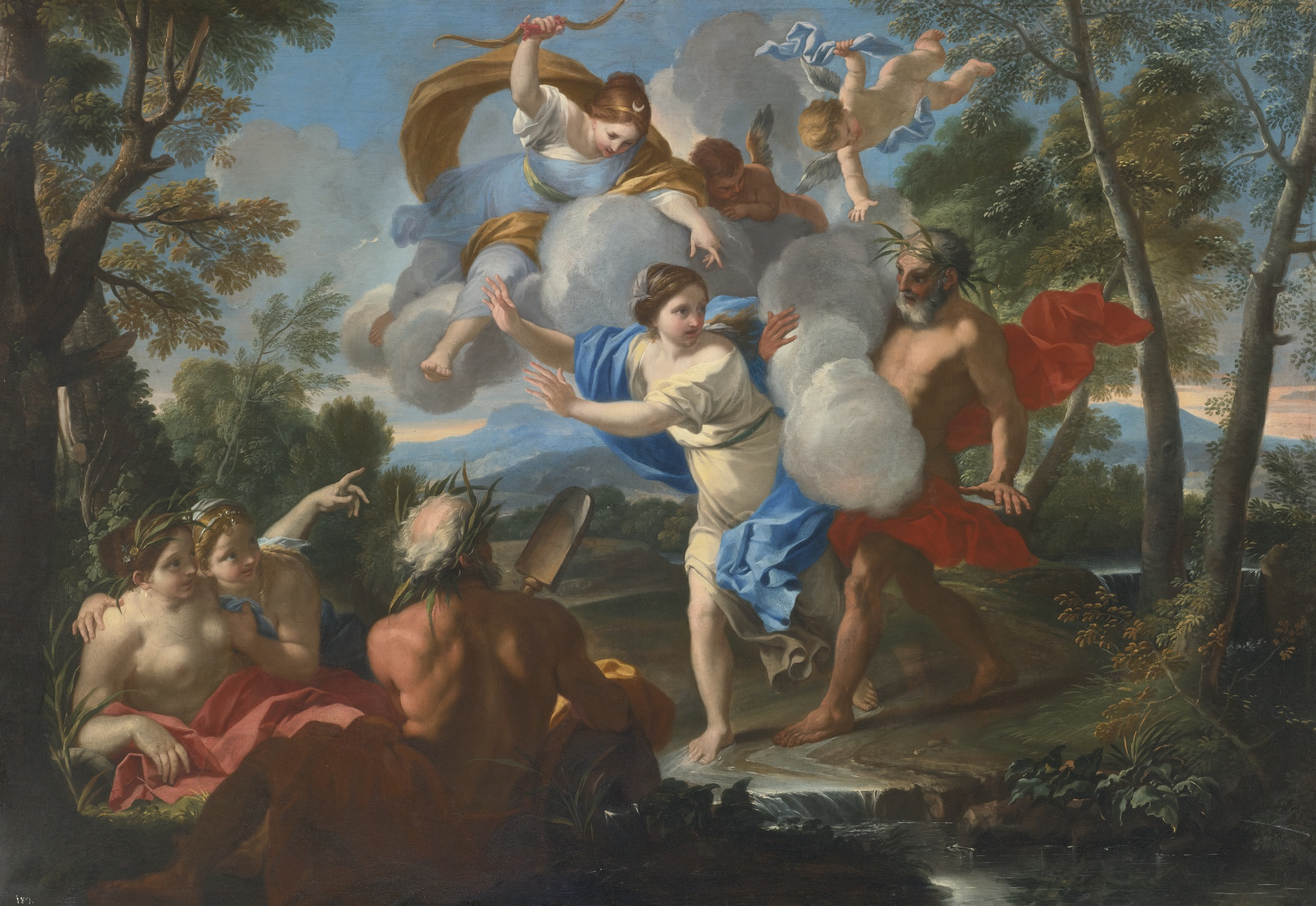
Alpheus and Arethusa by Luigi Garzi

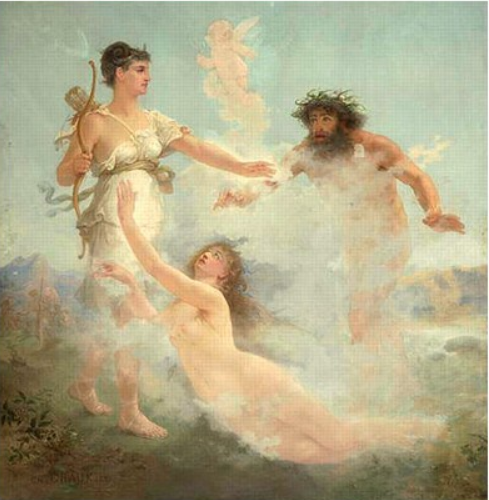
La Ninfa Aretusa by Alexandre Crauk

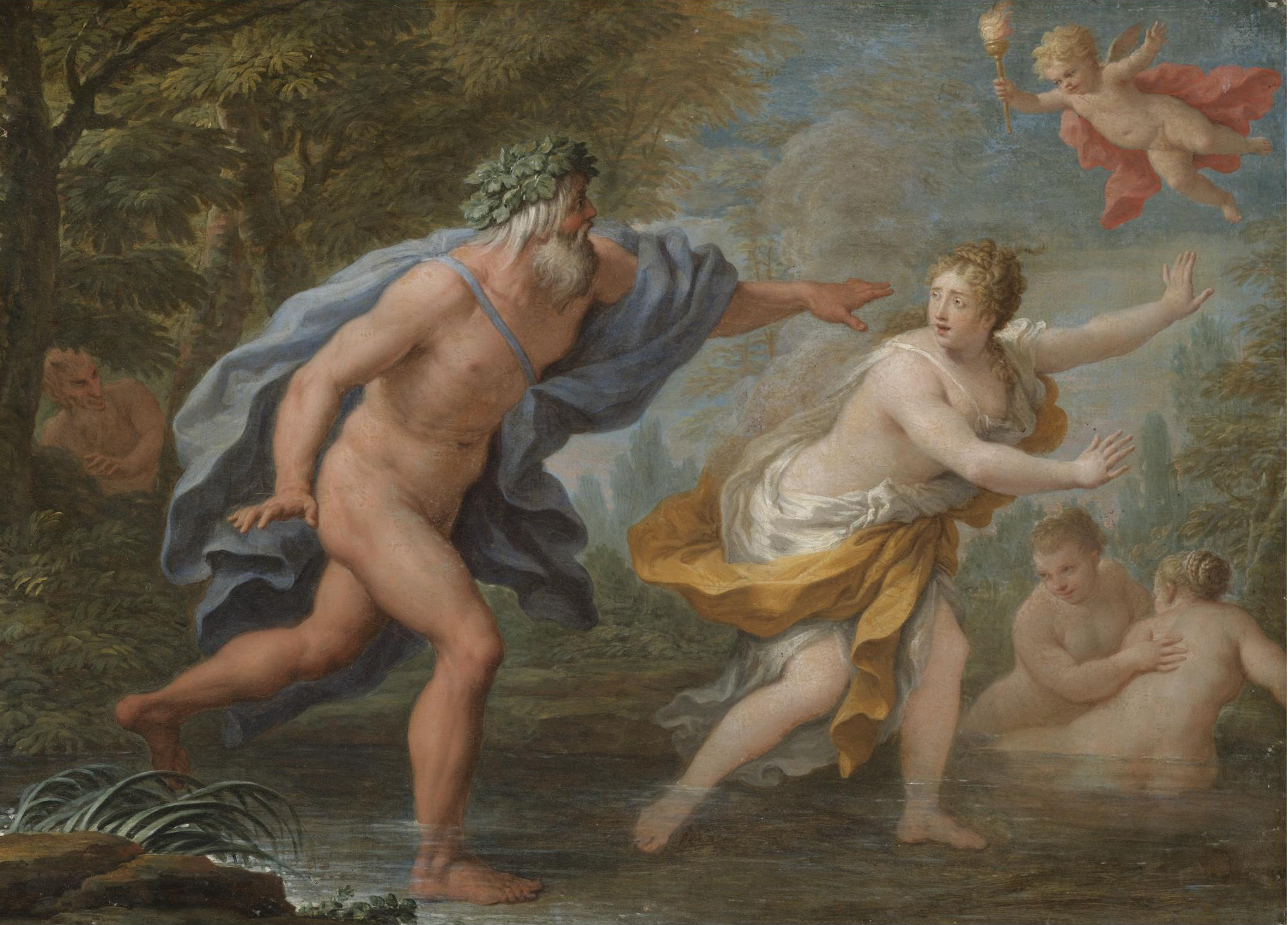
Alpheus and Arethusa by Paolo de Matteis (1710)

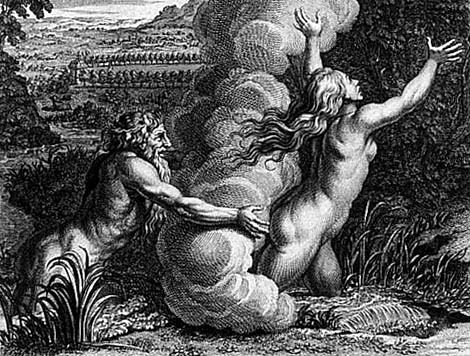
Alpheus and en:Arethusa by Bernard Picart

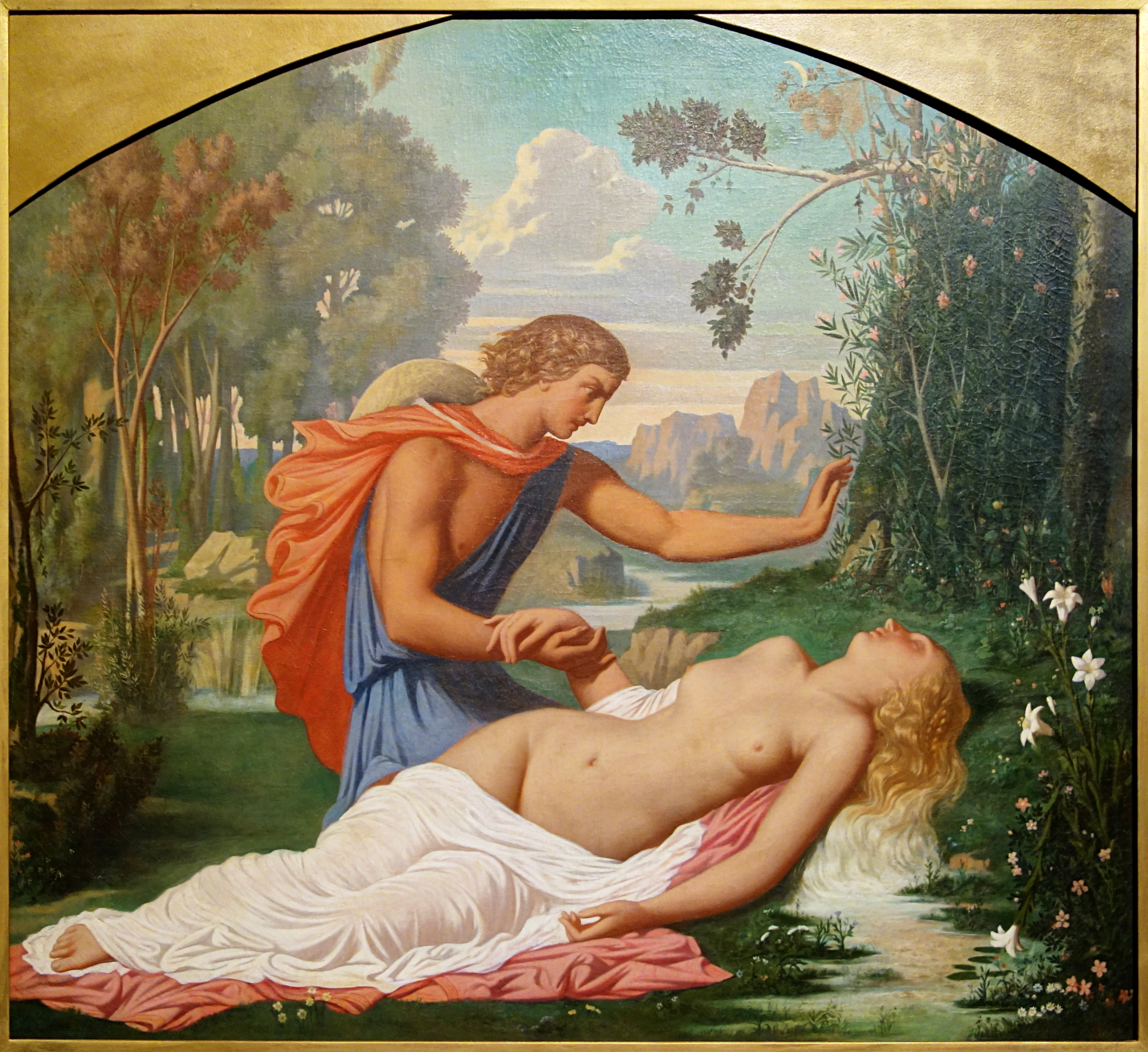
Aréthuse et Alphée by Léopold Burthe (1847)

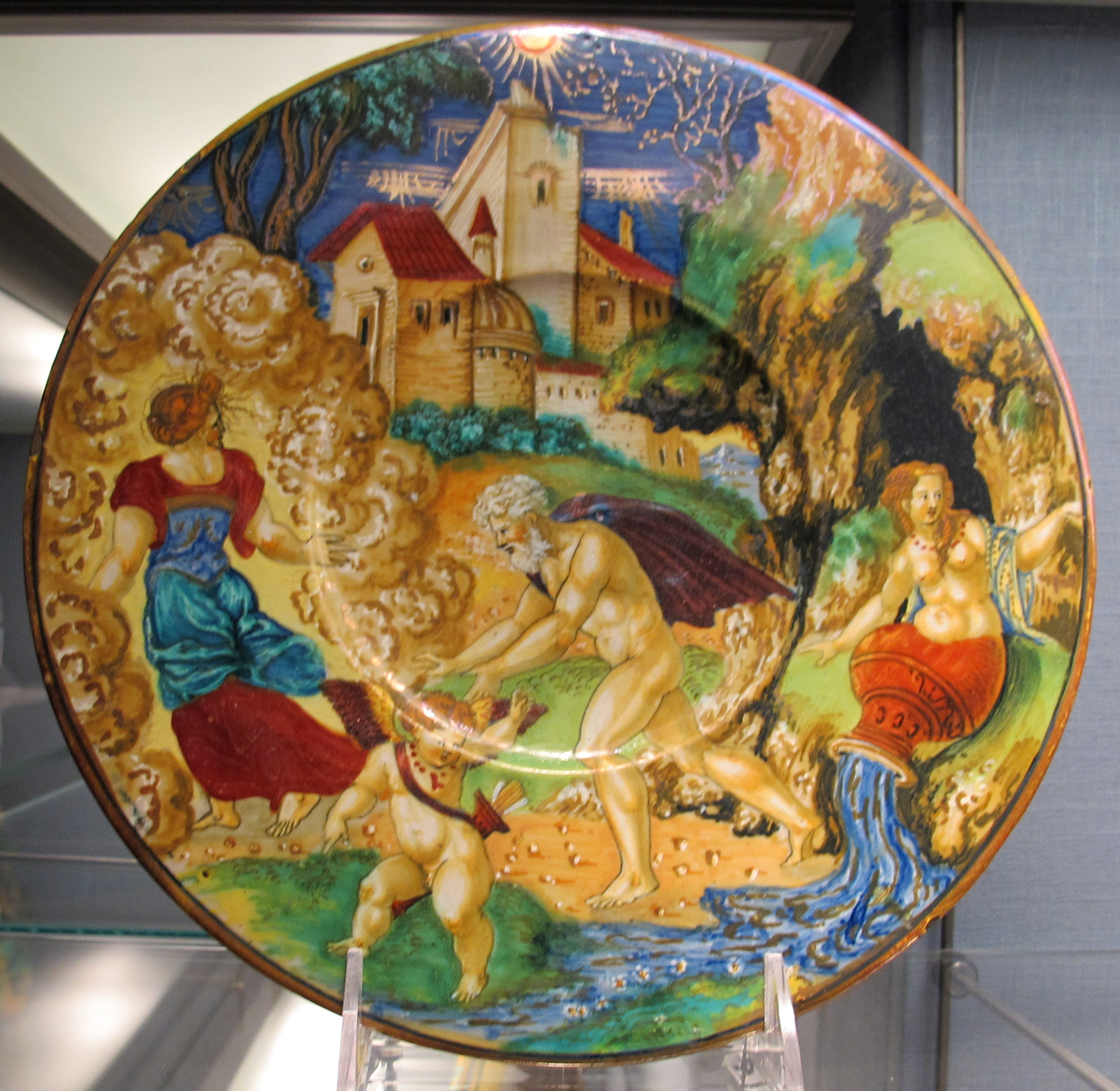
Arethusa

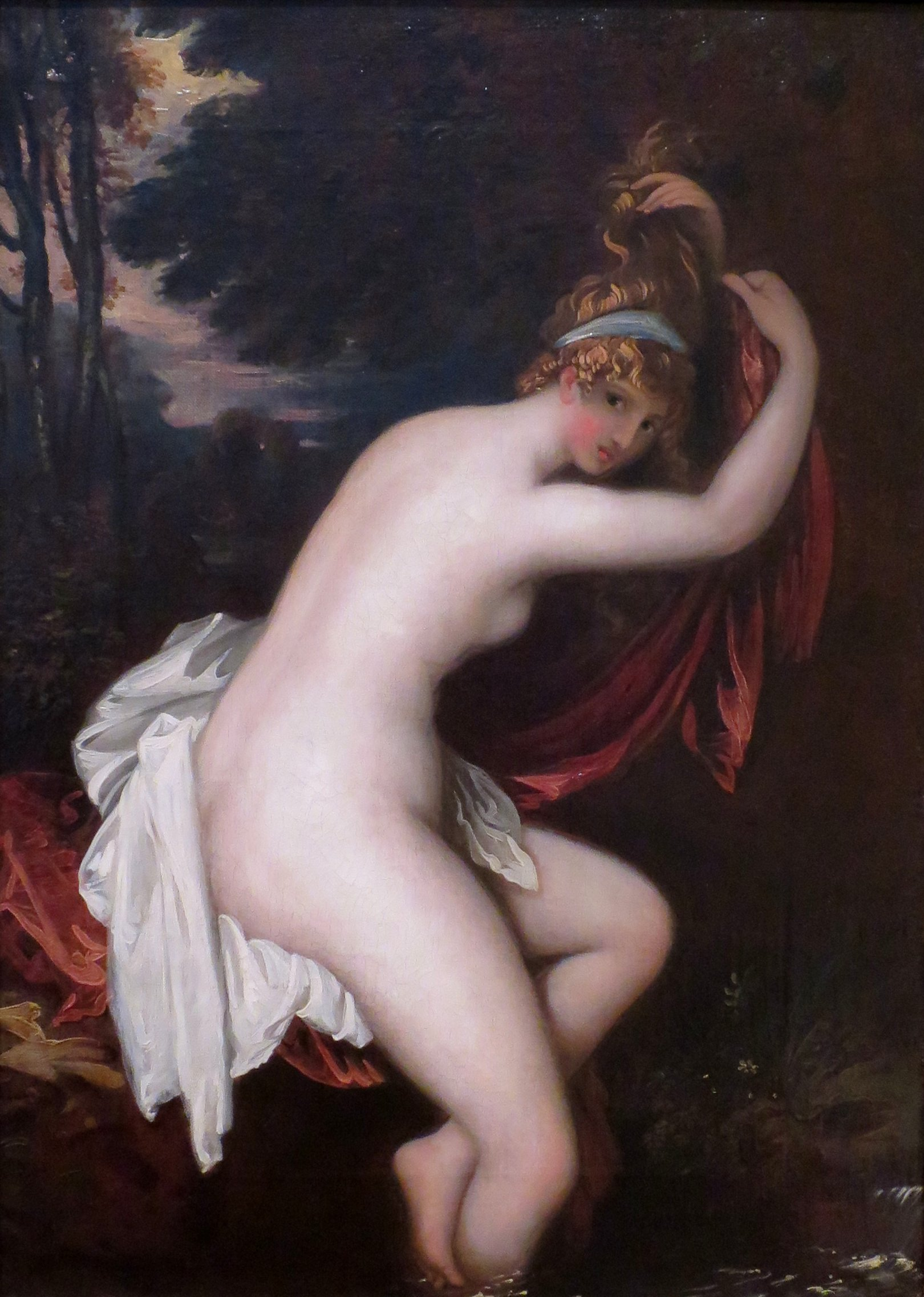
Arethusa by Benjamin West

=== Arethusa and Demeter ===
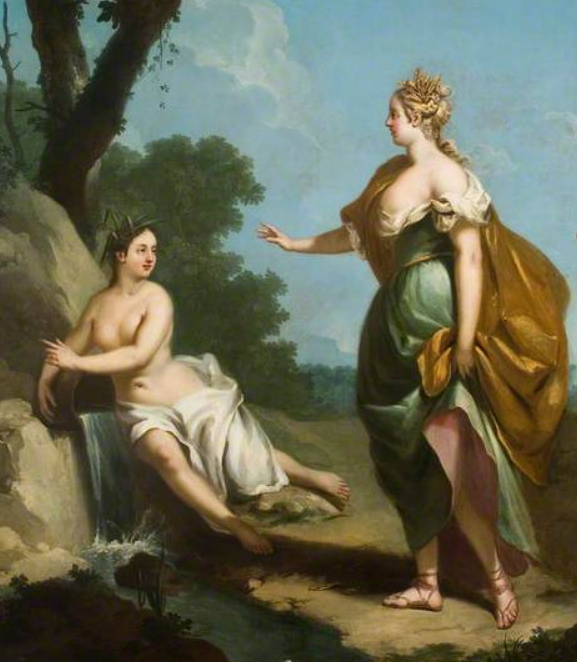
Arethusa Tells Ceres of Proserpine's Fate (1685–1775)

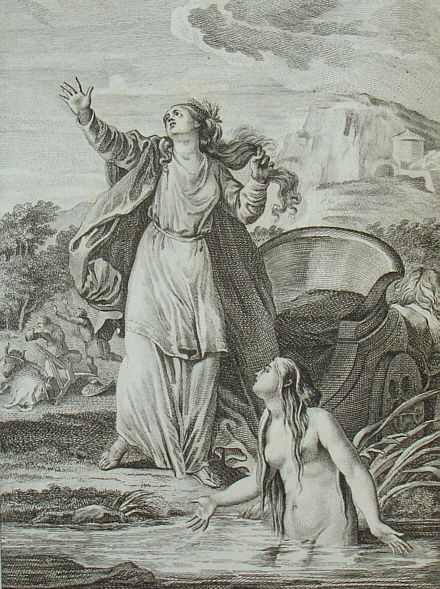
Ceres and Arethusa, engraving by Vincenz Grüner (1791)

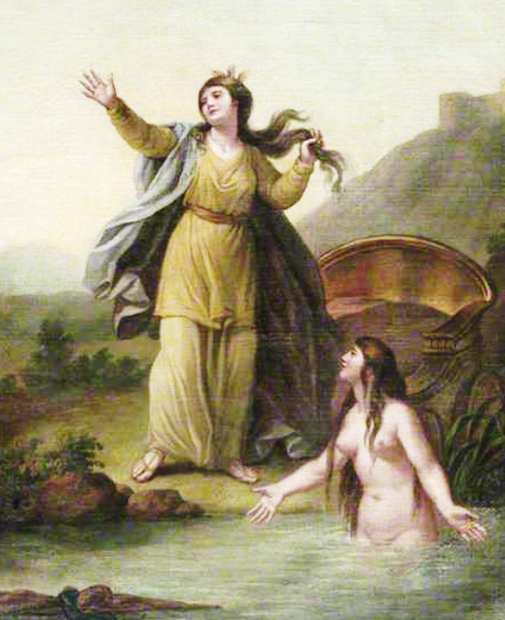
Demetra e Aretusa (1751–1801)

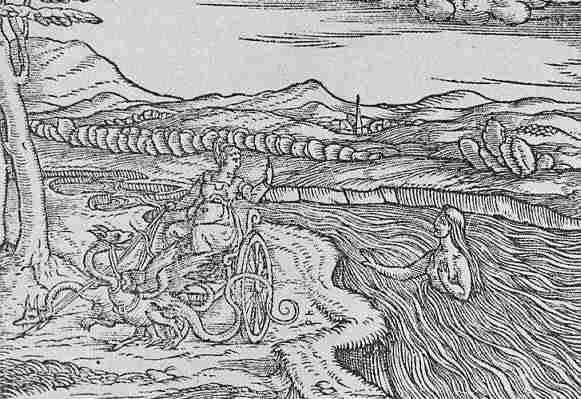
Ceres and Arethusa, engraving by Ludovico Dolce (1558)

== See also ==
- 95 Arethusa – an asteroid

== General and cited references ==
- Smith, William, Dictionary of Greek and Roman Biography and Mythology, London (1873). Online version at the Perseus Digital Library.
