= Harold F. Cherniss =

American historian (1904–1987)

Harold Cherniss
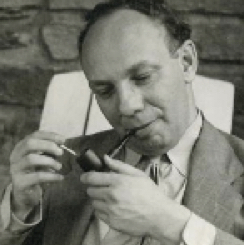
- Harold Cherniss in 1941-2
- Born: Harold Frederik Cherniss; 11 March 1904; St. Joseph, Missouri, U.S.
- Died: 18 June 1987 (age 83); Princeton, New Jersey, U.S.
- Occupations: Classicist, historian of ancient philosophy

Harold Fredrik Cherniss (11 March 1904 – 18 June 1987) was an American classicist and historian of ancient philosophy. While at the Institute for Advanced Study in Princeton, he was said to be "the country's foremost expert on Plato and Aristotle."

According to Leonardo Tarán, Cherniss's "greatest contribution to scholarship is doubtless his two books on Aristotle, supplemented by The Riddle of the Early Academy ... his published works on Plato, Aristotle, and the Academy are among the very few publications that revolutionized the field... His significance was recognized all over the world not only by classicists and philosophers but by the learned societies of which he was a member and the various universities that awarded him honorary degrees."

Cherniss's scholarship continues to shape the study of ancient Greek philosophy in several significant ways (see Work below):

- Cherniss is remembered as a champion of Platonic unitarianism, the contention that Plato's dialogues present a single, consistent and unchanging philosophical system.
- Cherniss "revolutionized the study of Presocratic philosophy" and stimulated revisionist histories of the earliest beginnings of European thought by showing that Aristotle's extensive reports were often unreliable and distorted by his own polemical aims.
- Cherniss attacked Aristotle's claims that Plato had esoteric "unwritten doctrines" and developed a mathematical ontology based on two opposing principles. This esoteric interpretation of Plato was later resurrected by the so-called Tübingen School, which was denounced in an influential review by Gregory Vlastos that repeatedly cited Cherniss. The skepticism of Cherniss and Vlastos towards the esoteric Plato remains dominant among English-speaking scholars, and contributed to the continuing split with much European Plato scholarship.
- Cherniss mocked other scholars' fanciful and aggrandizing reconstructions of the supposed lectures and the curriculum within Plato's Academy, and created an enduring restraint in scholarly images of the early Academy.

Before and after World War II, various circumstances intertwined the careers of Cherniss and his friend Robert Oppenheimer, the director of the Manhattan Project that developed the atom bombs dropped on Hiroshima and Nagasaki. Oppenheimer was later suspected of being a Soviet spy and lost his security clearance in the ensuing national scandal. Cherniss played a key role in helping Oppenheimer keep his job as director of the Institute for Advanced Study.

== Life ==
=== Missouri to Berkeley ===
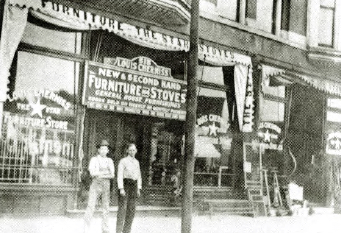
A relative of Harold Cherniss, Louis Cherniss, had a furniture store at 515 Main St., Council Bluffs, Iowa, across the Missouri River from Omaha, Nebraska.

Harold Cherniss's great-grandfather was Julius Cherniss, who came to Omaha, Nebraska, in 1882 with 160 Jewish immigrants from Vinnytsia in Ukraine, which was then part of the Russian empire. The first pogrom in Russia had occurred in Ukraine the preceding year, at the end of April 1881, and spread through the provinces of Ukraine. The Russian government then adopted a systematic policy of excluding Jews from their economic and public roles, and this provoked a mass emigration of Jewish refugees from Russia to the United States and other countries. There came to be a large, Jewish community in Omaha. Harold Cherniss's father was born in Vinnytsia on May 19, 1872, and ended up a hundred miles down the Missouri River from Omaha in St. Joseph Missouri.

Later, during the Nazi occupation of Ukraine in the early 1940s more than a million Ukrainian Jews perished in the Holocaust, including tens of thousands in Vinnytsia. Harold Cherniss was born in St. Joseph, Missouri, to David B. and Theresa C. Cherniss, and studied at the University of California, Berkeley, where he received an A.B. in 1925. In the summer of 1926, he studied with Paul Shorey, a prominent Plato scholar, at the University of Chicago.

=== A crucial year in Germany ===
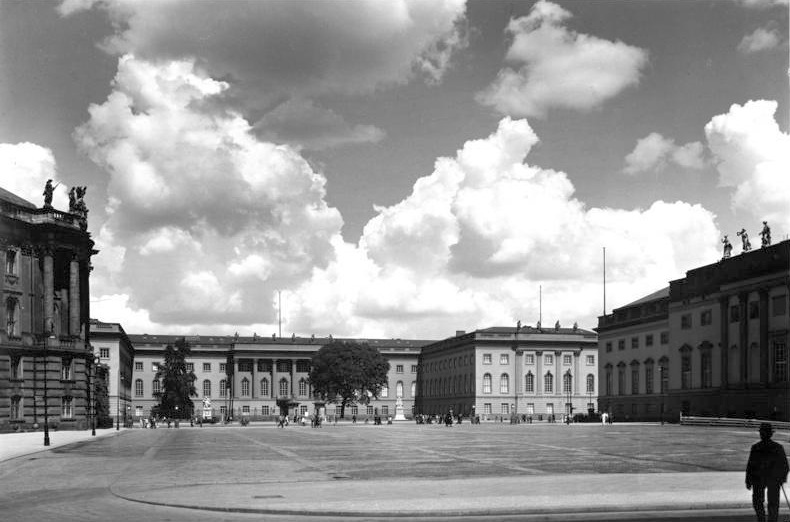
The University of Berlin

From 1927 to 1928, Cherniss studied with some of the leading classicists in Germany: in Göttingen with Hermann Fränkel and in Berlin with Werner Jaeger and Ulrich von Wilamowitz-Moellendorff. Cherniss thus arrived in the middle of a period (1924–1929) known in Germany as the Golden Era (German: Goldene Zwanziger) of the left-leaning Weimar Republic during which the economy was growing and there was a consequent decrease in civil unrest. These were relatively uneventful years between the hyperinflation of 1921-24 and the Nazi seizure of power in 1933. The 1920s saw a remarkable cultural renaissance in Germany. Influenced by the brief cultural explosion in the Soviet Union, German literature, cinema, theater, jazz, art, and architecture were in the midst of a phase of great creativity. This was also a revolutionary time in classical studies and philosophy. Jaeger had published his famous work Aristotle: Fundamentals of the History of His Development in 1923. Martin Heidegger published Being and Time in 1927.

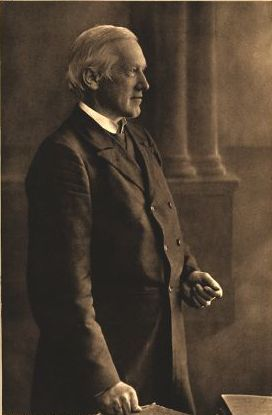
Ulrich von Wilamowitz-Moellendorff; by Rudolf Dührkoop

While Cherniss was studying in Germany, a crucial election campaign splintered the moderate and centrist forces. In 1927, the governing coalition that included both the left-wing and the anti-semitic German National People's Party, a precursor to Hitler's National Socialist Party, broke apart and precipitated a new election that the right-wing, democratic parties appeared to win. Although the implications were not all apparent during Cherniss's time in Germany, the election he witnessed proved to be a key turning point that fatally weakened the moderate and democratic forces in Germany and paved the way for the rise of Nazism a few years later.

A visitor to Princeton met with Cherniss many years later and reported that:

… we somehow got around to taking about Wilamowitz … [Cherniss] said that Wilamowitz would pepper his lectures with remarks about the political situation in Germany and that his students would applaud by loudly stamping their feet on the floor. The remarks were of such a nature that they caused Cherniss to develop an intense dislike for the man. I don't recall how he characterized the remarks, but Solmsen's description of the antidemocratic, anti-Catholic, anti-Semitic Prussian lens through which Wilamowitz viewed Weimar Germany would explain Cherniss's antipathy.

=== Pre-War teaching and Arthur O. Lovejoy ===
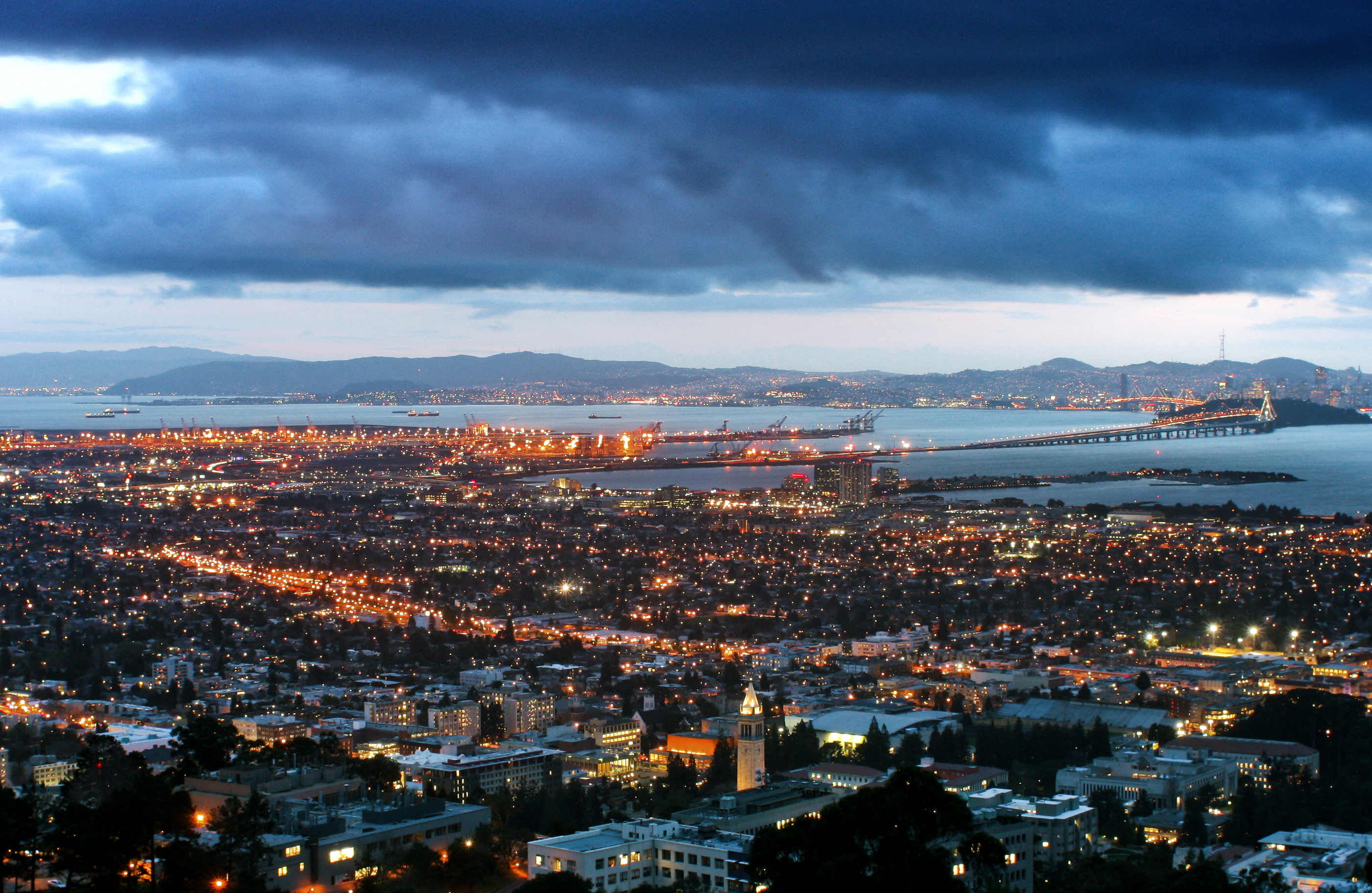
The University of California at Berkeley is marked by Sather Tower (1914) in the foreground. The bridge leads across the bay to San Francisco.

Cherniss received his doctorate from Berkeley in Greek, Latin and Sanskrit in 1930. He then taught Greek at Cornell University from 1930 to 1933, followed by ten years teaching at Johns Hopkins University and a return to the University of California before the war. A colleague at Berkeley remarked "He is a Platonist both as scholar and as thinker ..." He married Ruth Meyer, who had been a fellow student at Berkeley. Cherniss was a Guggenheim Fellow in 1941–1942.

While Cherniss was writing his three monographs at Johns Hopkins, the prominent philosopher Arthur O. Lovejoy was promoting an influential "history of ideas" approach to studying philosophical ideas that emphasized tracing their descent through successive historical periods. Lovejoy founded a "History of Ideas Club" at Johns Hopkins that included Cherniss, his friends Ludwig Edelstein and George Boas, and others:

Like the Cambridge Apostles and the Metaphysical Society of the last century, the History of Ideas Club has set itself the threefold aim of intellectual stock-taking, the pursuit of new truth, and the "cross-fertilization" of the various academic departments and disciplines. Specifically, it originated in the need of American thinkers after the First World War to become more conscious of the cultural heritage of which they then began to feel themselves the custodians.

Cherniss delivered papers at its meetings and the preface of Lovejoy's most well-known work, The Great Chain of Being (1936), thanks Cherniss for his contributions.

=== Service with British military intelligence in Europe ===
Hitler invaded Poland on September 1, 1939. In September 1941, groups of Nazi commandos tasked with eliminating the Jewish population of Ukraine massacred some 50,000 people in Vinnytsia, where Cherniss's father was born. Japan attacked Pearl Harbor on December 7, 1941.

In April 1942, Cherniss gave the Sather Lectures at Berkeley and soon afterwards volunteered for military service. He entered the United States Army as a private and was abroad by November 1942, where he worked in military intelligence. He was assigned to a British intelligence unit in England, France and Belgium, and rose to the rank of captain in three years. According to George Watt, Cherniss was working in Belgium immediately after the war and sought information from Aline Dumon (nicknamed "Michou"), who won medals for her clandestine work in the so-called Comet Line resistance network. Cherniss was seeking a young man who had betrayed scores in the Belgian and French undergrounds to the German occupation. In a 1985 interview, she remembered:

After the war, … Lt. Harold Cherniss, the American intelligence officer, telephoned me and said "Michou, you must come quickly." I went to Harold's office and he showed me twelve little pictures of identity cards and asked "Do you know that boy?" I said "Yes, [that's him] …" He said, "Michou, this is very important. Please look carefully." I said "No problem… [that's] the same boy." He laughed. I said "What happened, Harold?" "That boy is working for the Americans in Nuremberg." But not for long… [The boy] was tried and executed at Lille in 1945.

=== Cold War anxiety at Berkeley ===
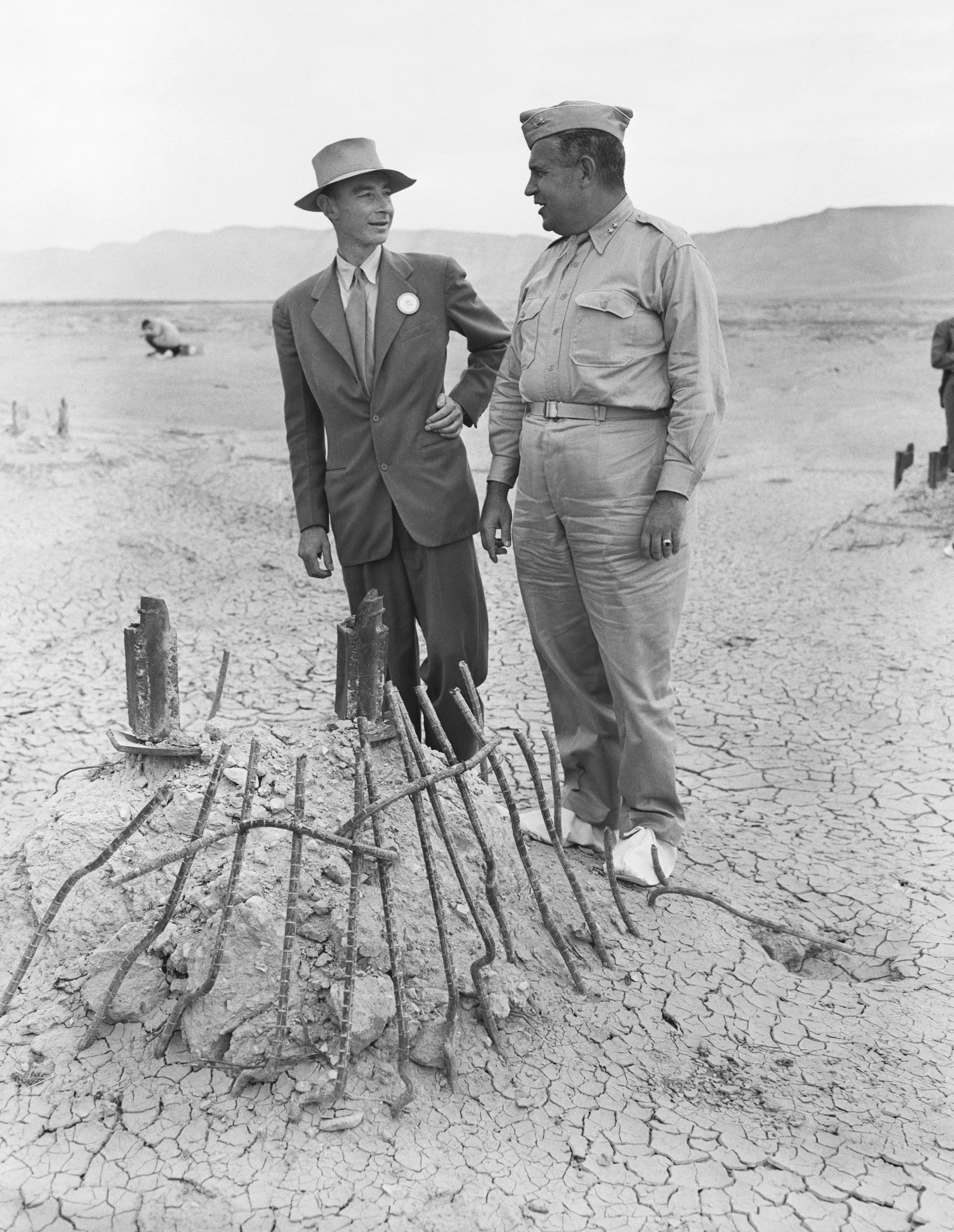
Oppeneheimer and General Groves examine the site of the first test of an atomic bomb in New Mexico in 1945.

In 1946, while still in Europe, Cherniss accepted an offer to return to Berkeley as a professor of Greek. With the Berlin blockade of 1948–1949 and the Communist victory in China and first Soviet atomic bomb in 1949, America and Berkeley were soon caught up in Cold War tensions. In the rising anxiety stoked by Senator Joseph McCarthy and the House Un-American Activities Committee, fears grew that communists were infiltrating American universities. These were acute at Berkeley where the Radiation Laboratory situated in the hills above campus had been heavily involved in developing the atomic bomb. In September 1949, McCarthy's committee commenced a hearing on alleged communist infiltration of the "Rad Lab." The University of California soon began requiring its faculty to sign an anti-communist loyalty oath. As these tensions mounted, Cherniss accepted an offer from the Institute of Advanced Study and resigned from his post at Berkeley: "his tenure there was cut short by the controversy which arose from the California Legislature's demand that state employees swear loyalty oaths."

Back on the East Coast, Cherniss remained involved in what quickly became a national debate over Berkeley's loyalty oaths and academic Freedom. By 1950, faculty resistance at Berkeley hardened and ultimately some 31 faculty members were fired. Recent immigrants among the faculty were particularly opposed: "persecuted by the Nazis and forced to leave Germany, they were rightly suspicious of the loyalty oath as a cold war demand for conformity or worse, inimical to the freedoms necessary at any institution of higher learning." Cherniss organized a public letter from the faculty of the Institute for Advanced Study in support of academic freedom that was distributed to the faculty at Berkeley and published:

Being aware that the regents have dismissed members of your faculty contrary to the recommendation of your committee on privilege and tenure, and that this action violates the policy of tenure and the principle of the faculty's self-determination and responsibility hitherto recognized by the University of California, we unanimously write to encourage you to unite in defense of your traditional policies and principles against encroachment.

The letter was signed by Oppenheimer, Cherniss, Einstein, Panofsky, and others. Similar letters were sent by the faculty of Princeton University and other universities.

The well-known German-Jewish medievalist Ernst Kantorowicz left Germany in 1939 after the Nazi government required civil servants to swear a loyalty oath to Hitler and became a professor at Berkeley. "With Germany's experience before his eyes," he refused to sign Berkeley's loyalty oath and was among those dismissed. Later, in 1951, Cherniss suggested he apply to the Institute for Advanced Study and he secured a permanent position there. Cherniss's old colleague at Johns Hopkins, the classicist Ludwig Edelstein, had also moved to Berkeley after the war but refused to sign the loyalty oath and lost his job. He later returned to a position at Johns Hopkins. In October 1952 Berkeley's loyalty oath was ruled unconstitutional by the California Supreme Court. The university was ordered to reinstate all dismissed faculty.

=== Institute for Advanced Study and Robert Oppenheimer ===
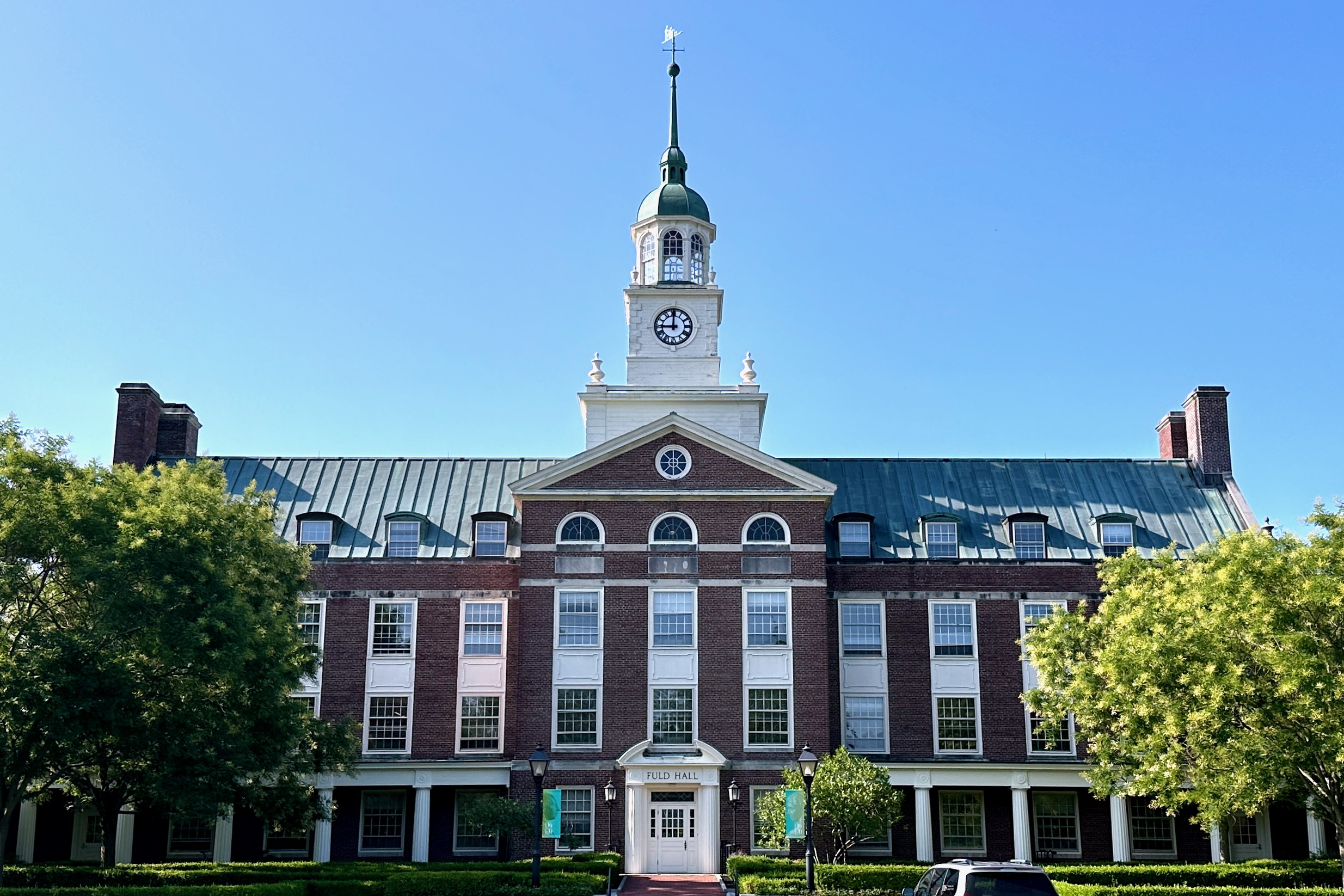
The Institute for Advanced Study in Princeton, New Jersey.

In 1948 Cherniss resigned from Berkeley and was appointed as a faculty member at the Institute for Advanced Study in Princeton, New Jersey. Anti-semitism was still widespread at this time in America even at universities like Princeton, but the Institute "employed scholars with absolutely no regard to religious persuasion or ethnicity." Cherniss was appointed by his old friend Robert Oppenheimer who is sometimes known as the "father of the atomic bomb."

Cherniss first met Oppenheimer at Berkeley in 1929. Cherniss had just married Ruth Meyer who had been in high school with Oppenheimer at the Ethical Culture Fieldston School in New York City. (Oppenheimer studied in Göttingen until July 1927 and Cherniss studied there in 1927–28.) After the war, there was a national scandal over suspicions that Oppenheimer was secretly a communist sympathizer. Cherniss recalled in a later interview there was some pre-war evidence of Oppenheimer's interest in Marxism but made light of it:

In fact, [Oppenheimer's] exposure to Marx occurred several years earlier, probably in the spring of 1932. His friend Harold Cherniss remembered Oppie visiting him in Ithaca, New York, that Spring and boasting that he had read Das Kapital. Cherniss just laughed; he didn't think of Oppie as political but he knew his friend read widely: "I suppose somewhere someone said to him You don't know about this? You haven't seen it? So he got this wretched book and read it!"

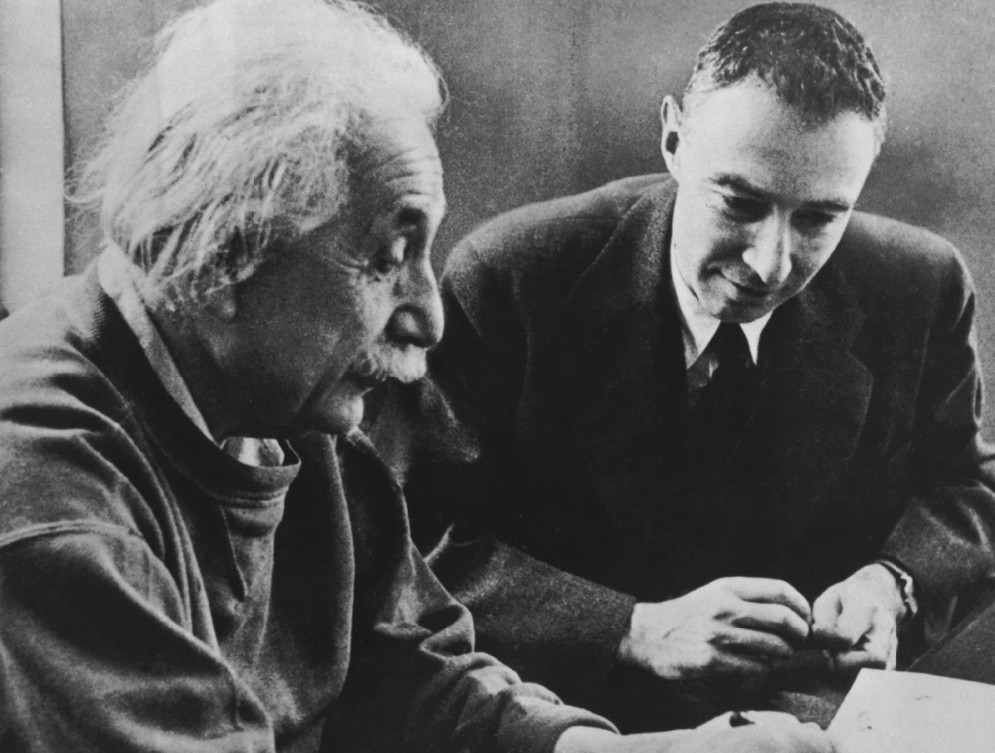
Einstein and Oppenheimer at the Institute for Advanced Study circa 1950

In July, 1945, when the world's first atomic bomb was exploded in the Trinity Test, Oppenheimer was famously supposed to have quoted a saying from the Bhagavad-Gita: "Now I am become death, the destroyer of worlds." Oppenheimer had studied Sanskrit at Berkeley and it was Cherniss who introduced Oppenheimer to his Sanskrit teacher, Arthur W. Ryder. Oppenheimer later claimed to have said those words but there is no contemporary evidence. In 1945, after Hiroshima and Nagasaki when Oppenheimer had become one of the world's most famous scientists, Cherniss saw him at Berkeley.

In 1947, Oppenheimer accepted an offer to take up the directorship of the Institute for Advanced Study. Cherniss was the first member of faculty Oppenheimer appointed to the institute.

=== Cherniss and the Oppenheimer Affair ===
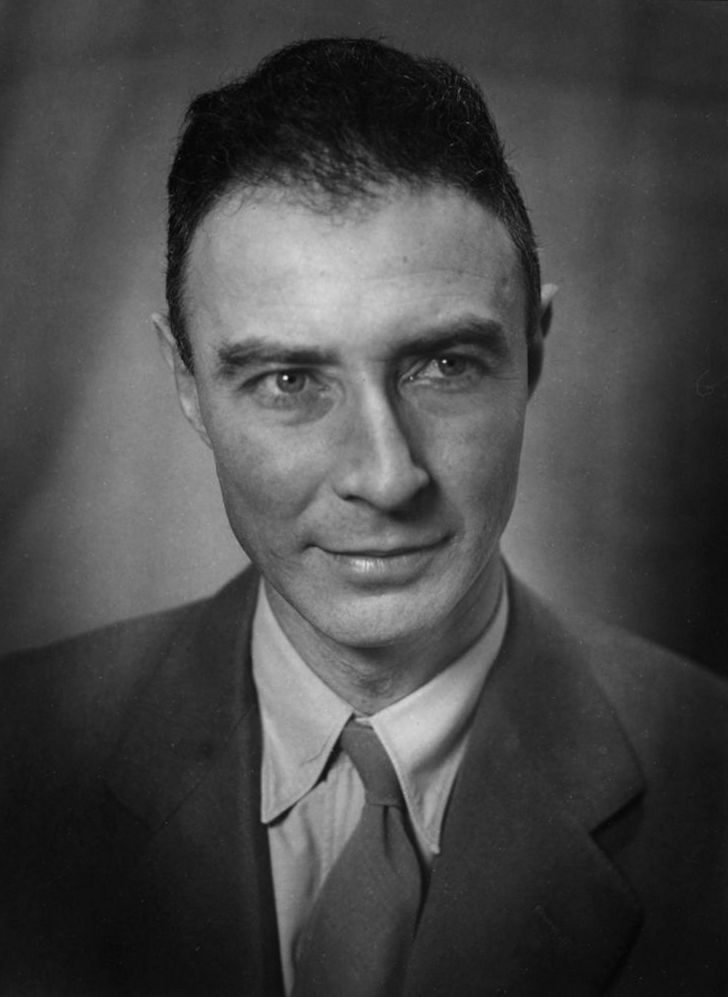
Oppenheimer was disgraced in a controversial four-week hearing in 1954.

Despite his fame, Oppenheimer had made many enemies who suspected he was a communist sympathizer or even a spy. These included Lewis Strauss who was both a commissioner on the new Atomic Energy Commission, which had control of the plants and personnel assembled during the war to produce the atomic bomb, and chairman of the board of trustees of the Institute of Advanced Study. Oppenheimer was called to testify before the House Un-American Activities Committee in 1949. Strauss and others pushed President Eisenhower to revoke Oppenheimer's security clearance. A hearing followed in April–May 1954 and Oppenheimer lost his security clearance. This national scandal produced a lasting rift between American scientists and the military. Historians with access to the American and Russian evidence have since concluded Oppenheimer was never involved in espionage for the Soviet Union and did not betray the United States, though in the late 1930s he had been a supporter of the Communist Party.

After Oppenheimer's downfall, Cherniss was instrumental in preventing his dismissal from the institute. Lewis Strauss sought to have Oppenheimer fired:

In July, Strauss told the FBI that he believed eight of the Institute's thirteen trustees were ready to dismiss Oppenheimer – but he decided to postpone a vote on the matter until Autumn so that it would not appear that Strauss as chairman was acting out of personal vindictiveness. This proved to be a miscalculation, because the delay gave members of the faculty time to organize an open letter in support of Oppenheimer… Strauss was forced to back off, and later that Autumn the trustees voted to keep Oppie as director.

According to Bird and Sherwin, "Oppenheimer's old friend Harold Cherniss took a lead in organizing the effort. After talking with a few trustees, Cherniss had realized that Oppenheimer's job was in doubt."

Cherniss and other faculty members of the Institute for Advanced Study published an open letter affirming his loyalty on Thursday July 1, 1954, in both The New York Times and The Herald Tribune and in the September Bulletin of the Atomic Scientists:

We, who have known [Dr. Oppenheimer] as a colleague, as director of our own institute, and as a neighbor in a small and intimate community, had from the first complete confidence in his loyalty to the United States, his discretion in guarding its secrets, and his deep concern for its safety, strength, and welfare. Our confidence in his loyalty and patriotic devotion remains unimpaired as our admiration for his magnificent public service is undiminished.

The letter was signed by H. F. Cherniss, A. Einstein, Freeman Dyson, K. Gödel, E. Panofsky, J. von Neumann, Hermann Weyl, Chen Ning Yang, and others. Cherniss's close friend and colleague, the art historian Erwin Panofsky, "considered the case a symbolic and sorry indictment of American society. In Panofsky's eyes Oppenheimer had been attacked for assuming the responsibility and for having the courage to proffer an independent voice of reason in response to the mindless conformism of the day. Though never formally prosecuted for any wrongdoing, this once-celebrated scientist was widely discredited in the public sphere for his 'humanistic' viewpoint. For Panofsky the case spoke volumes in regards to the anti-intellectualism and the narrowness of the national-political consensus in America at the time."

=== Controversy over John von Neumann's computers ===
John von Neumann and others developed the architecture of modern computers (the concept of a "stored program computer") while working at the Manhattan Project. After the war, his team built some of the first computers at the Institute for Advanced Study. This was controversial and Cherniss later recounted that he was one of the humanists who opposed von Neumann's project: "In hindsight, there were certainly very good reasons for building the machine. I was nonetheless against it. The computer had nothing to do with the purpose for which the Institute was founded. The computer was a practical undertaking but the Institute was not conceived of as a place for anything practical."

After von Neumann's death in 1957, the faculty organized a committee to terminate the project. All the permanent faculty met in Oppenheimer's living room. As Cherniss explained, "This was back when we used to do things right. Everything was informal." After the final decision was made, Cherniss elaborated "But we passed a more general motion. It was a declaration to have no experimental science, no laboratories of any kind at the Institute." In his history, Regis remarked "And so it has been ever since. The Platonic-heavenly fathers [i.e., advocates of the Institute's abstract and theoretical approach] had triumphed." Another faculty member, the physicist Freeman Dyson, said simply "The snobs took revenge."

=== Later years ===
The literary theorist George Steiner recalled an anecdote about his visit to the Institute for Advanced Study that gives insight into Cherniss's years there:

So I went to lunch with [the diplomat] George Kennan and Erwin Panofsky and the great Plato scholar Harold Cherniss. Afterwards Cherniss invited me to his beautiful office and, as we started chatting, Oppenheimer came into the room and sat on the table behind us. This is one of the most cruel, brilliant tricks: it makes you master of the situation, and the people who can't see you as you speak to them are completely helpless. Oppenheimer's mastery of these histrionic moves was incredible. Cherniss was showing me how he was editing a passage of Plato with a lacuna, and trying to fill it. When Oppenheimer asked me what I would do with such a passage, I began stumbling, and he said, "Well that's very stupid. A great text should have blanks." There I happily lost my temper: "Of all the pompous clichés," I said. "First of all, that's a quote from Mallarmé, as you, sir, must know. Secondly, it's the kind of paradox you could play with till the cows come home. But when you're asked to do an edition of a Plato text for us ordinary human beings, I am most grateful if the blanks are filled." Oppenheimer fought back superbly. He said, "No, precisely in philosophy you should know more than in poetry. It is the implicit missing that stimulates the argument."

Cherniss discussed Renaissance philosophy with the physicist Wolfgang Pauli, a friend of the art historian Erwin Panofsky, at the Institute for Advanced Study.

Cherniss spoke at a memorial service for Erwin Panofsky, a colleague at the Institute for Advanced Study, and said the "strong but subtle joys of private friendship that he afforded are too sensitive to endure expression."

David Keyt spent a year at the Institute in 1983–4, when Cherniss was nearly eighty years old, and recalled that:

Harold Cherniss was a professor emeritus at the Institute when I arrived, though he still had an office and came to it every day. (What is retirement like at a research institution? Cherniss remarked once that all it amounted to was having one's pay cut in half.) He spent most of his time maintaining his elaborate bibliography of Plato, carefully entering the information on each new book and article on an index card. He was still sharp and I was pleased to be able to discuss Plato with him.

Cherniss served at the Institute for Advanced Study until his death in 1987. According to a notice in the local paper, he died "after a long illness" in the Princeton Medical Center and "... was preparing the second volume [of Aristotle's Criticism of Plato and the Academy] when illness overtook him." In a memoir, Tarán said "this country has lost one of its greatest Hellenists and the history of ancient Greek philosophy one of its foremost scholars in the last two centuries."

=== Family and friends ===
Harold Cherniss married Ruth Meyer Cherniss in 1929. Her father was Max Meyer (March 29, 1876 – January 31, 1953). In 1944, together with M. C. Ritter, he founded the Fashion Institute of Technology in New York City. He was born in Wissembourg, Bas-Rhin, Alsace, France and became a prominent lawyer, clothing manufacturer, and labor leader in New York City.

In 1931, he was named by the then Governor of New York, Franklin D. Roosevelt, to a commission to study workers' compensation. In 1937, he became Chairman of the Millinery Stabilization Commission. In 1951, he became chairman of the board of trustees and in 1952 President of the Fashion Institute of Technology. Ruth Cherniss's mother was Eugenia Grace Meyer (Goodkuid), who was born in New York on June 1, 1878. Ruth Cherniss had been a childhood friend and schoolmate of Robert Oppenheimer at the Ethical Cultural School in New York City. She was a student at Berkeley with Cherniss and received her A.B. in 1926. Cornell University awarded her a doctorate in 1933–4. Thus she was finishing her doctorate while Harold Cherniss was an instructor at Cornell. In 1939, Ruth Cherniss published an article entitled "The Ancients as Authority in Seventeenth-Century France," in The Greek Tradition, edited by G. Boas. In 1980, she wrote a book about her father, Max Meyer. Ruth Cherniss was a friend of Oppenheimer's wife Kitty. In 1956, Ruth Cherniss was president of the Princeton chapter of the League of Women Voters. Harold and Ruth Cherniss resided at 98 Battle Road near the Institute for Advanced Study. Ruth Cherniss died on April 11, 2000.

Harold Cherniss's father, David Benjamin Cherniss was born on May 19, 1872, in Vinnytsia, and died on December 19, 1936, in Los Angeles. His second wife was Millie B. Cherniss. Harold Cherniss's mother Theresa Cherniss (née Hart) was born on August 19, 1878, in Iowa. Harold Cherniss's grandfather Benjamin Cherniss and grandmother Bosheva Cherniss were born in Vinnytsia c. 1845. Harold Cherniss had a brother named Edward Hart Cherniss (1909–1993) and a sister named Lillian Blanche Cherniss.

Cherniss's assistant at the institute was Gwendolyn Groves Robinson. She was the daughter of General Leslie Groves, who served as the military supervisor of the Manhattan Project.

== Work ==
=== Advocate of Platonic unitarianism ===
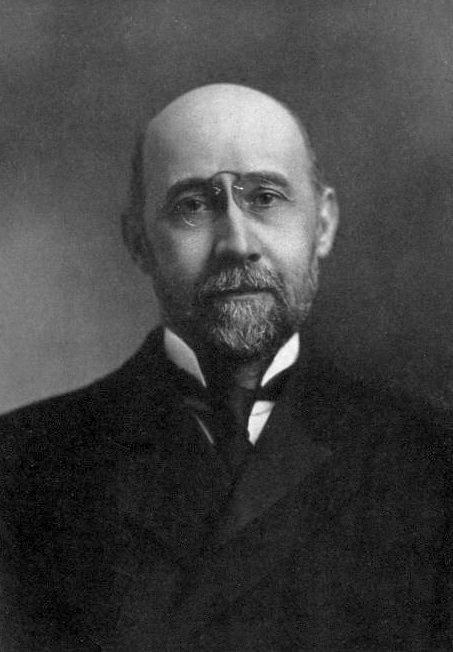
Professor Paul Shorey (here, circa 1909) taught Cherniss that Plato's philosophy remained consistent through all the dialogues.

In Plato studies, "unitarianism" is the view that Plato's dialogues contain a unified and systematic philosophy. It is opposed, for example, to "developmentalism" that holds Plato's doctrines evolved through the decades in which he wrote the dialogues. Cherniss studied at Berkeley with Roger Jones. According to Fontenrose,

Jones had been a ... graduate student at Chicago and had taken his doctorate under Paul Shorey. He was perhaps Shorey's most able and promising student in Greek philosophy, especially in Platonism. Jones readily adopted Shorey's views of Plato's teachings, stressing the unity of Plato's thought from the Apology and Crito down to the Laws, and opposing the Burnet-Taylor school, which saw a significant change in Plato's thought after the Republic ... Jones passed Shorey's doctrine on to Harold Cherniss, his most brilliant student.

Cherniss was thus said to be "the heir and apologist of Shorey's interpretation of the unity of Plato's thought." Cherniss continues to be regarded as an influential advocate of unitarianism: "One of the most important versions of unitarianism is represented by the likes of Paul Shorey, Harold Cherniss, and their disciples."

=== Aristotle's Criticism of Presocratic Philosophy (1935) ===
Cherniss's landmark monograph transformed studies of Pre-Socratic philosophy by forcing scholars to re-evaluate their sources and raise the rigor of their arguments. This contributed to a wave of creative revisionism about the origins of European thought. Aristotle's treatises contain more quotations from and reports about Pre-Socratic philosophy than any other early source. After these, historians must rely on commentators and Neo-Platonists who often come half a millennium later. Until Cherniss, therefore, Aristotle was thought our best and most reliable guide to Pre-Socratic philosophy because he was so early. Cherniss demonstrated "in detail how much of the conceptual apparatus often attributed to Presocratic thinkers in fact represents Aristotle's own reformulation of their theories in terms of his own philosophy." This created skepticism about Aristotle's reports and forced later historians to be more selective and to justify their use of them deliberately and rigorously. Writing in the 2008 Oxford Handbook of Presocratic Philosophy, Patricia Curd and Daniel W. Graham said that Cherniss

… found multiple sources of error in Aristotle's treatments of the Presocratics… Since Cherniss's book was published, scholars have been cautious of Aristotelian interpretations of the Presocratics; they cannot be used as uncritical data for reconstructing Presocratic theory. There have been some attempts to rehabilitate Aristotle… Overall, however, Cherniss showed that modern reconstructions of the Presocratics could improve on and correct ancient ones.

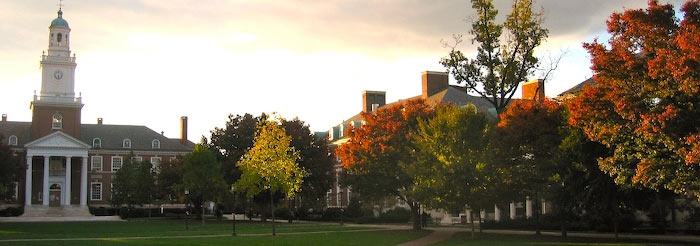
Cherniss wrote his three, pre-war books at Johns Hopkins University in Baltimore, Maryland

=== "The Philosophical Economy of the Theory of Ideas" (1936) ===
This well-known article was first published in The American Journal of Philology and gives a positive overview of Plato's system. It was reprinted in Vlastos' 1971 anthology Plato I: Metaphysics and Epistemology and Allen's 1965 anthology Studies in Plato's Metaphysics. Here Cherniss argues that Plato's Theory of Forms at once served as the foundation of Plato's ethics, epistemology, and ontology, and resolved skeptical problems in all three areas:

The phenomena for which Plato had to account were of three kinds, ethical, epistemological, and ontological. In each of these spheres there had been developed by the end of the fifth century doctrines so extremely paradoxical that there seemed to be no possibility of reconciling them with one another or any one of them with the observable facts of human experience. The dialogues of Plato, I believe, will furnish evidence to show that he considered it necessary to find a single hypothesis which would at once solve the problems of these several spheres and also create a rationally unified cosmos by establishing the connection among the separate phases of experience.

After establishing that the Theory of Forms was the common root of Plato's system, Cherniss argued in the second place that, by a principle of "economy," the effectiveness of the theory in three disparate areas justified Plato's assertion of the existence of the Forms.

=== Aristotle's Criticism of Plato and the Academy (1944) ===
This monumental, massive, and dense (600 pp.) tome aims to be a comprehensive assessment of whether or not Aristotle generally understood Plato's doctrines and whether or not Aristotle's much debated reports of Plato's mathematical ontology are credible. Cherniss treats the following topics in turn: diaeresis, matter, the origin and nature of the Platonic Forms, the arguments for the Forms, the relation of Plato's Forms and Substances, and the relation of Forms and Particulars. In each case, Cherniss finds that Aristotle has rather grossly and willfully misunderstood Plato. The chapter on diaeresis, for example, concludes:

From the passages thus far considered there emerge certain general tendencies of Aristotle's critical method … Essential distinctions among various Academic theories are likely to be disregarded, and a criticism pertinent to one form of a given doctrine may be applied to all of its variations … and, finally, a doctrine may be attacked in a form which is the result of Aristotle's own interpretation and formulation …

Cherniss's pre-war preface announces this as the first of two volumes, but after the war he never published the sequel on Plato's supposed mathematical ontology. Cherniss's views on this question, however, are summarized in The Riddle of the Early Academy.

=== The Riddle of the Early Academy (1945) ===
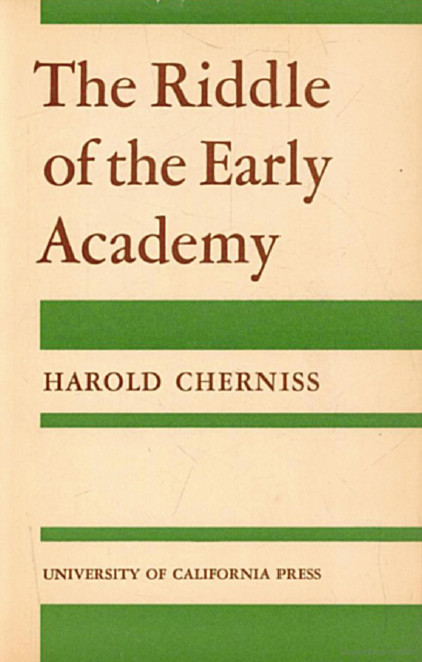
Harold Cherniss, Riddle of the Early Academy

The vigorous polemic contained in this small volume (109 pp.) significantly shaped later Plato scholarship and began the process that split much of English-language and Continental Plato research into two communities. The unitarianism of Shorey and Cherniss holds that Plato's dialogues are both a consistent and complete exposition of Plato's system. Cherniss saw both contentions under attack by the "higher critics" of Plato scholarship in his day. Burnet, Taylor, and others argued for radical changes in Plato's theories and an esoteric mathematical ontology taught orally in the academy. According to Cherniss:

… although few if any of the "higher critics" of Platonism accept the Burnet-Taylor hypothesis, all of them adopt explanations which differ from that hypothesis only in degree… accepting Aristotle's testimony concerning the idea-numbers, they find themselves constrained to assert that the theory of ideas underwent at Plato's hands a radical alteration or a radical development and that this new form of the theory … was never committed to writing by Plato and can be recovered only from the reports of Aristotle …

The first of Cherniss's three Sather Lectures defended the completeness of the dialogues as an account of Plato's philosophy by attacking the external evidence for Plato's "Lecture on the Good" and his supposed "unwritten doctrines":

The riddle of the early Academy is epitomized in the discrepancy between Aristotle's account of Plato's theory of ideas and that theory as we know it from Plato's writings. To explain that discrepancy, scholars have constructed the hypothesis of an oral Platonic doctrine. I have tried to show that that hypothesis is unsatisfactory not only because the evidence for Plato's one attested lecture fails to support it, but also because the inconsistency in Aristotle's testimony itself appears to contradict it.

In Lecture II, Cherniss defended the consistency of the dialogues by arguing that Plato's supposed late development of a mathematical ontology is a misinterpretation imposed by Aristotle on material found in the dialogues: "… the theory of idea-numbers which Aristotle ascribes to Plato is just Aristotle's own interpretation of the necessary consequences [he finds] implied in the doctrine of the Platonic dialogues …" Thus there is no reason, for example, to see in the dialogues a critique of an "early" Theory of Forms that was to be remedied by a later mathematical theory.

Lecture III was a broad attack on the notion of oral teaching in the Academy:

… the inconsistency of Aristotle's own testimony and the discordant opinions of the different members of the Academy show definitely that Plato did not himself "teach" his pupils or associates a doctrine of mathematical objects at all and did not even resolve their disagreement about the meaning of what he had written on the subject by laying down an authoritative interpretation… All the evidence points unmistakably to the same conclusion: the Academy was not a school in which an orthodox metaphysical doctrine was taught, or an association the members of which were expected to subscribe to the theory of ideas.

In the course of his lectures, Cherniss also mocked scholars' aggrandizing myths about the nature of Plato's Academy:

… in most of the authoritative treatments of Plato, after a scholarly reference to [Plato's single attested public] lecture on the Good, the singular becomes an unexplained plural within the paragraph, the lecture a whole series of lectures, and before the section has been finished we are being told that Plato gave "regular lectures," "systematic and continuous expositions in lecture form on some of the most important points in his doctrine." This "expansion" of the evidence—if I may use the term—has been embellished by the different expositors with different details, a comparison of which would afford a certain cynical amusement to the historian of critical scholarship.

Cherniss concluded: "The external evidence for the nature of the Academy in Plato's time is extremely slight."

=== Post-War work and the Cherniss–Owen Debate ===
Leonardo Tarán summarized Cherniss' later work:

Cherniss' own work after the Second World War was in breadth and quality as exact, remarkable, and original as his earlier work. Part of it took the form of long and detailed book-reviews which constitute short monographs containing important and original research. He also published several long and masterly articles. Four of these, on Plato's Timaeus, could by themselves form a monograph, and are probably the most distinguished and important work on Plato done within the last forty years.

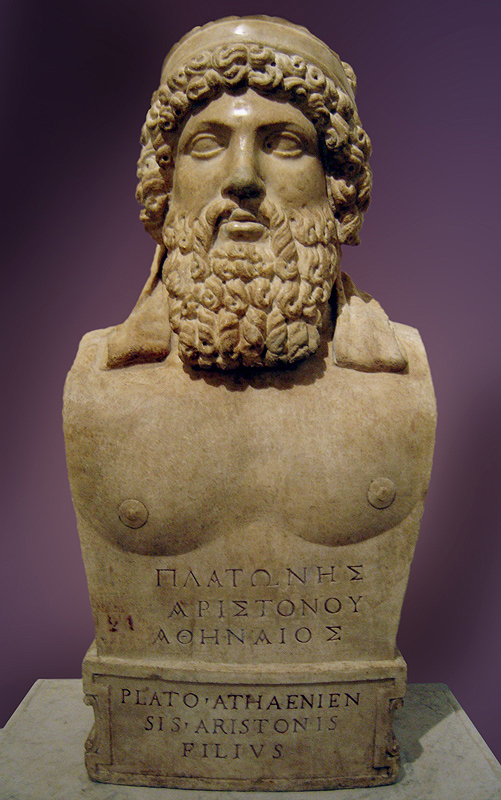
Herm of Plato. The Greek inscription reads 'Plato [son] of Ariston, Athenian' (Rome, Capotiline Museum, 288).

The most well-known of Cherniss' post-war publications was his rebuttal of a new attack on Platonic unitarianism that arose in 1953. In a famous paper that explicitly criticized Cherniss, the Oxford philosopher G. E. L. Owen argued that Plato's Parmenides marked a radical change in the Theory of Forms. He claimed that Plato did not entirely reject his own theory but instead rejected a symmetrical resemblance relation between particulars and Forms (paradeigmata) as well as the sharp dichotomy between being and becoming. These two doctrines are propounded in the Timaeus, which was then widely considered one of Plato's latest dialogues. Owen, therefore,

… sought to make his view plausible by proposing to remove the Timaeus from the late group and place it among the middle dialogues, after the Republic but before the Parmenides. Owen launched a many-pronged attack on the traditional late dating of the Timaeus … [and] attempted to undermine the credibility of the stylometric evidence for the late date of the Timaeus.

Cherniss' magisterial reply appeared in 1957 and provoked a large and controversial literature on the question. According to William J. Prior in 1985,

The exchange between Cherniss and Owen initiated a debate which has continued to this day. Both positions have won some support, but neither has emerged victorious from the fray. The work of Ryle and Owen has effectively destroyed the consensus of scholars on the development of Plato's metaphysics and the date of the Timaeus, but it has not produced a new consensus. Nor has Cherniss' contrary position won the support of a majority of scholars.

More recent assessments have been moderately more favorable to Cherniss' position than to Owen's, at least upon the question of chronology: in a 2005 essay, for example, Platonic translator and philosopher Donald Zeyl concludes that "… the orthodox view appears to have held its own. Both a more nuanced examination of the texts and more recent computer-assisted stylometric studies have done much to reinforce it." Similarly, Terence Irwin, writing in 2008, finds that Cherniss' response to Owen is "generally (though not in every detail) convincing"; and a 2012 passage from Debra Nails mentions that Cherniss "trounced" Owen's proposed (re-)dating of the Timaeus. (In the same volume, it may be worth noting, Prior chooses to reiterate his above assertion, but with an inverted emphasis: i.e., he there writes that Owen's thesis is that which "has not won the support of the majority of scholars".)

=== Controversial legacy ===
One of Cherniss's most lasting influences has been in the debates over the evidence in Aristotle for esoteric interpretations of Plato. Cherniss attacked this evidence directly in his Riddle and broadly aimed to discredit Aristotle's interpretations of Plato in his 1945 book. In the Fifties, however, the so-called Tübingen School, initiated by the German scholars Hans Krämer and Konrad Gaiser, resurrected esoteric interpretations of Plato. The Tübingen School was famously denounced by Gregory Vlastos in a 1963 review that repeatedly cited Cherniss's earlier work. English-speaking scholars thereafter tended to be skeptical about esoteric interpretations of Plato. Adherents of the Tübingen School are common in Germany and Italy but in 2012 Nikulin remarked "... the majority of the scholars in the Anglo-American world remain unconvinced that the Tübingen interpretation offered a glimpse into the historical Plato."

In a 2014 article entitled "Harold Cherniss and the Study of Plato Today," the leading Plato scholar Lloyd Gerson argued that the approaches to Plato shaped by the work of Cherniss and Vlastos have come to dominate contemporary Plato scholarship in the English-speaking world and (wrongly, he argues) led to the dismissal of the Tübingen approach that dominates in continental Europe:

While acknowledging the highest level of scholarship in Cherniss's book Aristotle's Criticism of Plato and the Academy, I think the influence of this book has been largely baleful. Vlastos's review in Gnomon inadvertently made matters worse … The divergence in the work of much European and North American Plato scholarship since 1950 can be traced, I believe, to the respect paid or not paid to Aristotle's testimony about Plato's philosophy.

=== Other works ===
Cherniss's edition of some of Plutarch's works, Stoic and Platonic Works (1967), won the Charles J. Goodwin award from the American Philological Society.

== Awards and honors ==
Cherniss was a fellow of the British Academy, of the Royal Academy of Arts and Science of Goteborg, of the Academie Royale Flamande de Scis., of the Lettres et Beaux Arts de Belgique. He was a member of the American Philosophical Society and the American Academy of Arts and Sciences.

He has an honorary degree from Brown University (L.H.D.) in 1976.

== Publications ==
=== Books ===
- The Platonism of Gregory of Nyssa (Berkeley: University of California Press, 1930).
- Aristotle's Criticism of Presocratic Philosophy (Baltimore: Johns Hopkins Press, 1935; reprint: New York: Octagon Books, 1964).
- Aristotle's Criticism of Plato and the Academy (Baltimore: Johns Hopkins Press, 1944).
- The Riddle of the Early Academy (Berkeley: University of California Press, 1945).
- Selected Papers (Leiden: Brill, 1977).

=== Articles ===
- "The Philosophical Economy of the Theory of Ideas", American Journal of Philology 57 (1936): 445–456.
- "Plato as Mathematician", Review of Metaphysics, 4 (1951): 395–425.
- "The Characteristics and Effects of Presocratic Philosophy", Journal of the History of Ideas 12 (1951): 319–345.

=== Translations ===
- Plutarch's Moralia, Vol. 12. (with W. C. Helmbold) (Cambridge, Mass.: Harvard University Press, 1957).
- Plutarch's Moralia, Vol. 13 Part 1. (Cambridge, Mass.: Harvard University Press, 1976).
- Plutarch's Moralia, Vol. 13 Part 2. (Cambridge, Mass.: Harvard University Press, 1976).
