= Johann Brucker =

Johann Brucker may refer to:

- Johann Jakob Brucker (1696–1770), German historian of philosophy
- Johann Brucker, German Army Oberstleutnant, awarded the Knight's Cross on 5 April 1945
