= E. N. Tigerstedt =

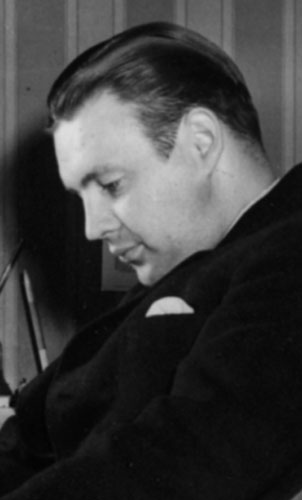
- E. N. Tigerstedt
- Born: Eugène Napoleon Tigerstedt; 28 April 1907; Warsaw, Poland
- Died: 27 June 1979 (aged 72); Samos, Greece
- Occupations: Literary historian, classicist, Plato scholar, professor, journalist, editor

Eugène Napoleon (E.N.) Tigerstedt (28 April 1907 - 27 June 1979) was a Finnish-Swedish academic. In his lifetime, Tigerstedt was one of the leading and most respected literary historians in Scandinavia and is best known internationally for his contributions to Plato scholarship.

== Biography ==
When Tigerstedt was born in Warsaw it was part of the Russian Empire. So was Finland. So his return to Finland later was a movement within the Empire.

Tigerstedt became a Doctor of Philosophy in 1939, a docent (assistant professor) in 1941, and a professor in 1946 at the University of Helsinki. He was elected member of The Finnish Society of Sciences and Letters in 1946.

He was a literary critic at the newspapers Svenska Pressen ('Swedish Press,' 1938–1941) and Hufvudstadsbladet ('Journal of the Capital,' 1941–1946).

In 1948, he left Finland and moved to Stockholm where he became a literary editor at the publishing houses Natur & Kultur and later Bonniers. At Natur & Kultur, he became something of a pioneer in introducing modern science fiction to Sweden, and was involved in the publication of the series 'Tomorrow's Adventure.' Later, however, when a hopeful student wanted to write his dissertation on H. G. Wells, Tigerstedt replied to his proposal with the words: "The candidate has misunderstood the subject. Science fiction is not literature".

Between 1956 and 1973 he was Professor of Literary History with Poetics (later 'Literature') at Stockholm University. He was also active as a literary critic at the Svenska Dagbladet ('Swedish Daily').

Tigerstedt published other books (partly with collaborators) on Bertrand Russell, Dante, part of Bonnier's General Literature from 1959 to 1964, as well as New Illustrated Swedish Literature in 1967.

== Scholarship on Plato and Sparta ==
Internationally, Tigerstedt is known primarily as a scholar specializing in Plato and classical studies.

His The Decline and Fall of the Neoplatonic Interpretation of Plato: an outline and some observations (1974) made an important contribution to the history of interpretations of Plato. G. A. Press said '... Tigerstedt's historical sketch ... remains the best available history of Plato studies.' Brisson's 1977 review said 'This historical argument [of Tigerstedt] is truly convincing and sheds light on many points unknown or poorly known about the Platonic tradition during the Middle Ages, through the Renaissance, and to the Enlightenment and the dawn of rigorous history of philosophy. In addition, this little book fills a lacuna that E. N. Tigerstedt himself deplores: namely, the absence of a global history of the Platonic tradition.' In Rasmussen's review of Wolfsdorf's Trials of Reason (2008), he noted 'Wolfsdorf's reliance on the exceptional scholarship of E. N. Tigerstedt.' Tigerstedt's work was discussed in 2013 by Catana. Tigerstedt's work is cited in the Wikipedia articles Neoplatonism and Allegorical Interpretations of Plato, and in the article on 'Plato's Aesthetics' in the Stanford Encyclopedia of Philosophy.

In a sequel of sorts, Tigerstedt's Interpreting Plato (1977) surveyed the interpretive assumptions and governing solutions found in dominant interpretative modes of Plato scholarship in the last century and a half. It was reviewed by Burnyeat.

Tigerstedt's 1970 article 'Furor Poeticus : Poetic Inspiration in Greek Literature Before Democritus and Plato', and his 1969 book Plato’s Idea of Poetical Inspiration are widely cited in the literature on Plato's Ion.

Tigerstedt's three-volume, The Legend of Sparta in Classical Antiquity was also an important contribution. A 2012 review by Ephraim David of a book on Sparta began with the overview 'The perception of Sparta throughout history has been the subject of important work in the last eighty years or so. François Ollier’s pioneering study, focused on Sparta’s idealization in Ancient Greece was followed by E.N. Tigerstedt’s magnum opus, which broadened the scope of the research to the whole of classical antiquity.'

== Method and approach to literature ==
Tigerstedt was known among his colleagues and students for his vivid lectures, their historical outlook, and his language skills, but he was fairly dismissive of the new ideas that came to influence literary theory in the 1940s (for example, the so-called 'New Criticism' and psychoanalytic methods). He emphasized the content of each work and genre history; as a researcher and critic he assumed that literary studies should aim to reconstruct and bring to life the author consciously thinking in the context of his time, and thus to avoid considerations that were for the most part unconscious or invisible to the poet himself.

For example, in his Dante: the Time, the Man, the Work (1967), Tigerstedt discussed Dante's rhetoric and worldview, his handling of the people and events of his time in the context of the genre of 'comedy,' and how Dante intended that his main characters, including "Dante" himself, should be interpreted by readers. Tigerstedt ascribed to Dante considerable cunning and an ability to manipulate the reader's emotions, but rejected any attempt to see the emotions, characters, and conflicts in Dante's poetic world as reflections of the author's private ego and his emotions. To see an author's people and language as primarily an expression of such private emotions or his "inner creative flow" would give in to unscientific subjectivity and romantic illusions. Tigerstedt pointed out several times that Dante, in his opinion, had been interpreted too romantically. Tigerstedt's book on Dante was recently discussed along with other works in the Svenska Dagbladet.

== See also ==
- Neoplatonism
- Allegorical interpretations of Plato
