= Wilhelm Gottlieb Tennemann =

German historian (1761–1819)

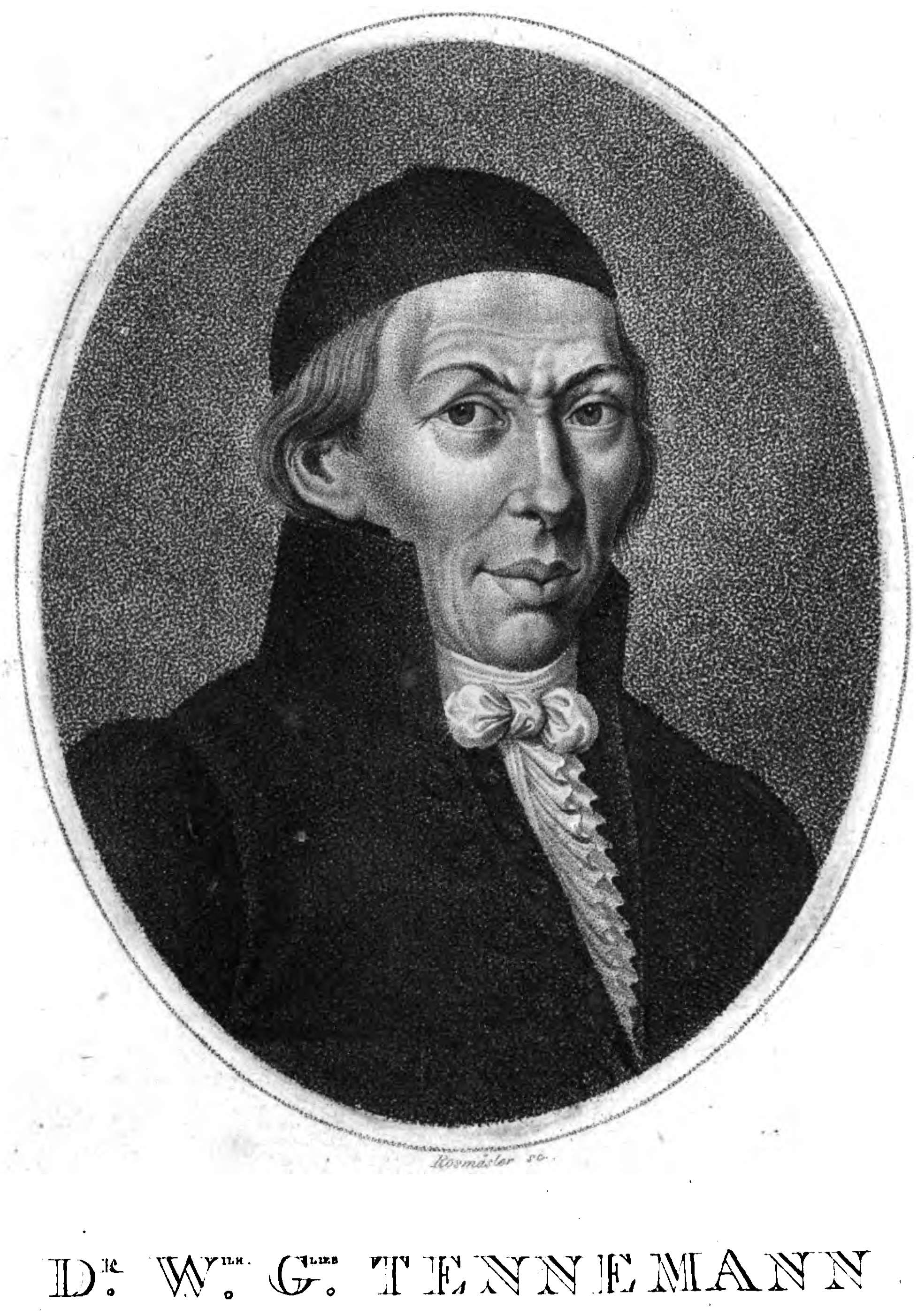
Wilhelm Gottlieb Tennemann (1761–1819).

Wilhelm Gottlieb Tennemann (7 December 1761 – 30 September 1819) was a German historian of philosophy.

== Life ==
He was born and educated at Erfurt. In 1788, he became a lecturer on the history of philosophy at the University of Jena. Ten years later, he became a professor at the same university, where he remained till 1804. His great work is an eleven-volume history of philosophy (Geschichte der Philosophie), which he began at Jena and finished at the University of Marburg, where he was professor of philosophy from 1804 till his death. He was one of the numerous German philosophers who accepted the Kantian theory as a revelation.

In 1812, he published a shorter history of philosophy (Grundriss der Geschichte der Philosophie für den akademischen Unterricht), which was translated into English in 1852 under the title A manual of the history of philosophy.

He died at Marburg.

== See also ==
- Allegorical interpretations of Plato
