= Allegorical interpretations of Plato =

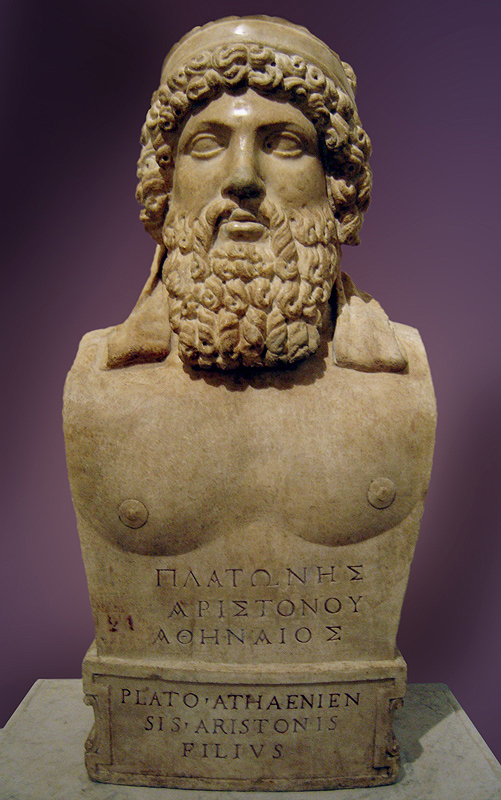
Herm of Plato. The Greek inscription reads: "Plato [son] of Ariston, Athenian" (Rome, Capitoline Museums, 288).

Many interpreters of Plato held that his writings contain passages with double meanings, called allegories, symbols, or myths, that give the dialogues layers of figurative meaning in addition to their usual literal meaning. These allegorical interpretations of Plato were dominant for more than fifteen hundred years, from about the 1st century CE through the Renaissance and into the 18th century, and were advocated by major Platonist philosophers such as Plotinus, Porphyry, Syrianus, Proclus, and Marsilio Ficino. Beginning with Philo of Alexandria (1st c. CE), these views influenced the Jewish, Christian, and Islamic interpretation of these religions' respective sacred scriptures. They spread widely during the Renaissance and contributed to the fashion for allegory among poets such as Dante Alighieri, Edmund Spenser, and William Shakespeare.

In the early modern period, classical scholarship rejected claims that Plato was an allegorist. After this rupture, the ancient followers of Plato who read the dialogues as sustained allegories were labelled "Neo-Platonists" and regarded as an aberration. In the wake of Tate's pioneering 1929 article Plato and Allegorical Interpretation, scholars began to study the allegorical approach to Plato in its own right both as essential background to Plato studies and as an important episode in the history of philosophy, literary criticism, hermeneutics, and literary symbolism. Historians have come to reject any simple division between Platonism and Neoplatonism, and the tradition of reading Plato allegorically is now an area of active research.

The definitions of "allegory", "symbolism", and "figurative meaning" evolved over time. The term allegory (Greek for "saying other") became more frequent in the early centuries CE and referred to language that had some other meaning in addition to its usual or literal meaning. Earlier in classical Athens, it was common instead to speak of "undermeanings" (Gk., hyponoiai), which referred to hidden or deeper meanings. Today, allegory is often said to be a sustained sequence of metaphors within a literary work, but this was not the ancient definition; at the time, a single passage, or even a name, could be considered allegorical. Generally, the changing meanings of such terms must be studied within each historical context.

== Allegory within Plato's dialogues ==
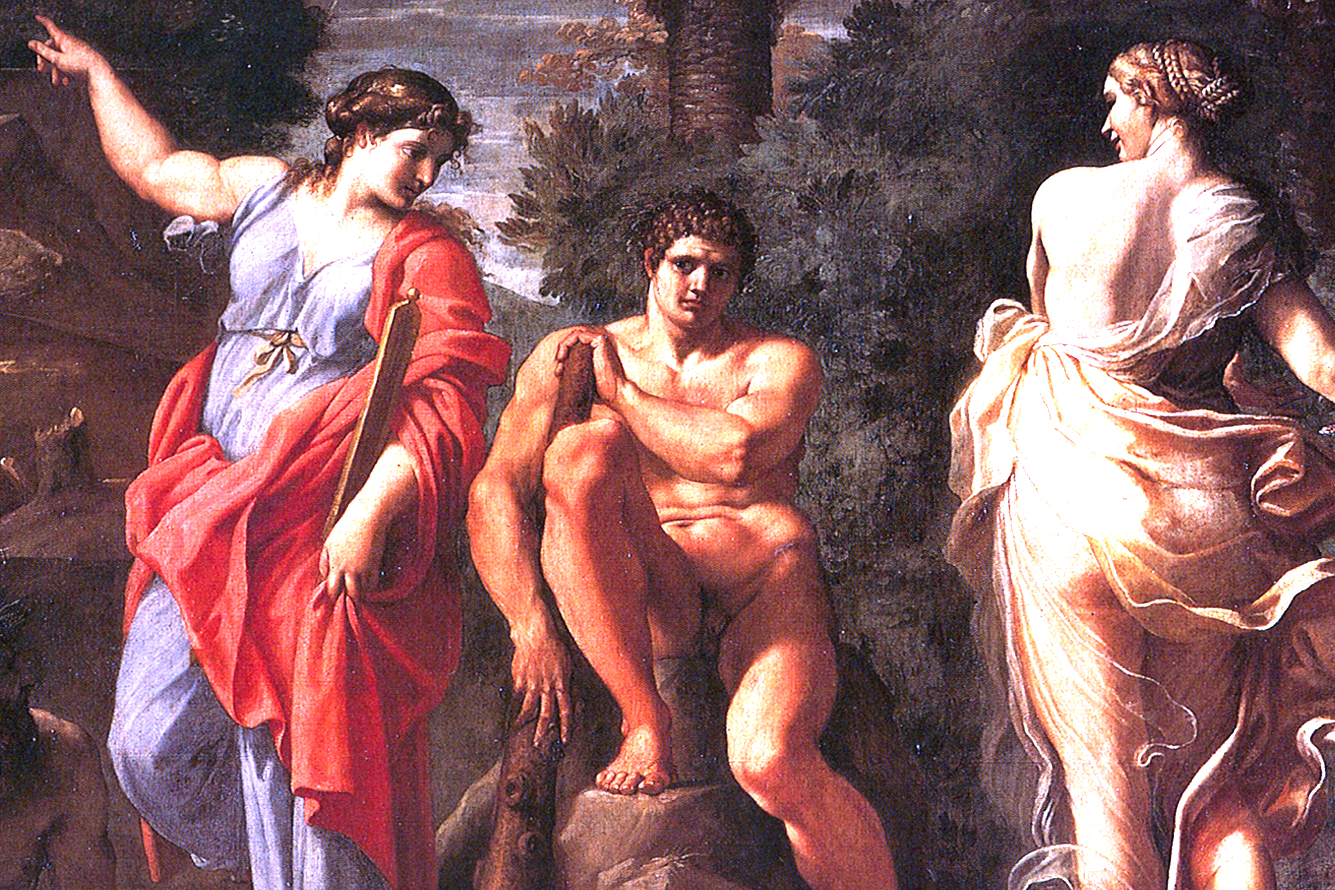
Greek allegory arguably began with personifications in Greek mythology (Eros is love, Athena is wisdom). Greek philosophical allegory may have begun with Parmenides or Empedocles but is clear in Socrates' friend, Prodicus the Sophist, and his famous tale of "Hercules at the Crossroads". Discussed by Xenophon, the Neo-Platonists, and many others, it became well-known again in the Middle Ages and Renaissance. On the left, Virtue is calling Hercules to the higher path of glory through hardship, while Vice is enticing him toward the easy life of pleasure (Annibale Carracci, The Choice of Hercules, detail, 1596, National Museum of Capodimonte).

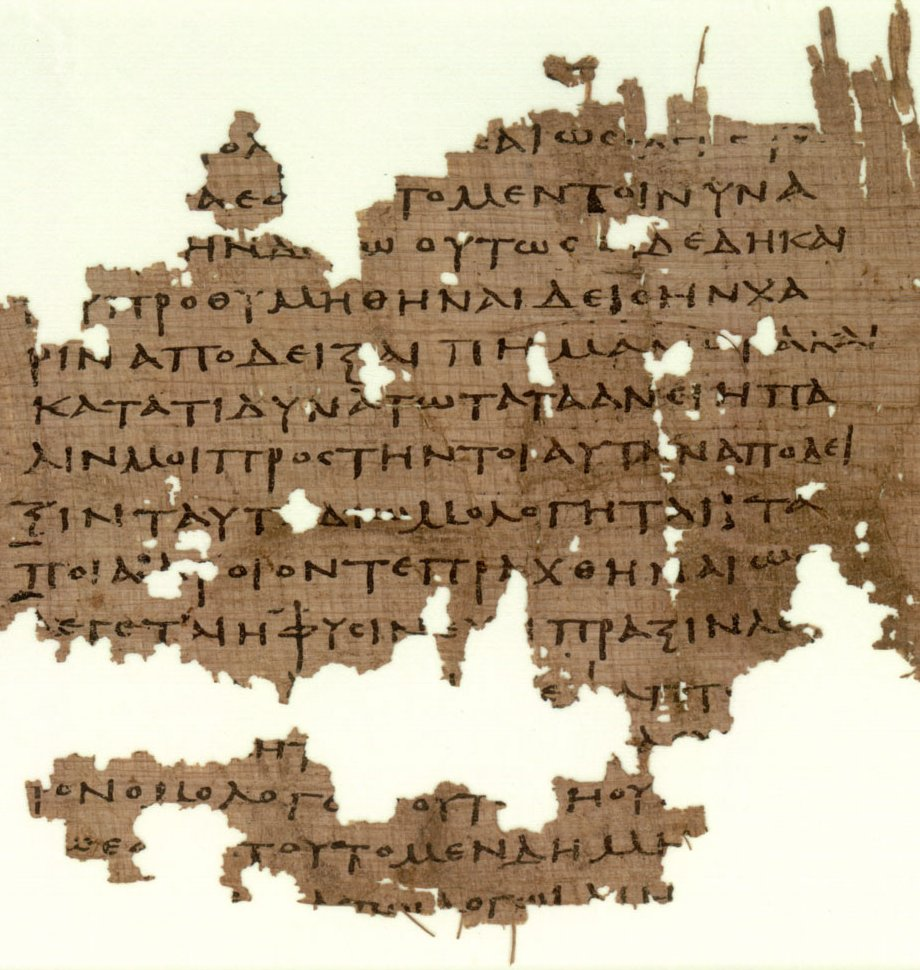
Papirus Oxyrhynchus, with fragment of Plato's Republic

As a young man, Plato encountered debates in the circles around Anaxagoras and Socrates over whether Homer's poems contained allegories. Plato refers to these debates and made allegories and the nature of allegory a prominent theme in his dialogues. He uses many allegorical devices and explicitly calls attention to them. In the Parable of the Cave, for example, Plato tells a symbolic tale and interprets its elements one by one (Rep., 514a1 ff.). In the Phaedrus, Socrates criticizes those who offer rationalizing, allegorical explanations for myths (229c6 ff.). Plato's own views on allegorical interpretation, or 'allegoresis', have long been debated. Ford concluded that:

Allegoresis is viewed by Plato as an uncertain method and dangerous where children are concerned, but he never denies outright the possibility of its being used in a more philosophical way. In the passage rejecting allegory from the Republic (378d), the reasons are primarily pedagogical and social rather than theological or methodological... Plato's disquiet is focused on popularisers of subtle interpretation, not on the method itself ...

The core of Plato's philosophy is the Theory of Forms (or Ideas), and many writers have seen in this metaphysical theory a justification for the use of literary allegory. Fletcher, for example, wrote:

The Platonic theory of ideas has two aspects which lead to allegorical interpretations of both signs and things ... To speak of "the idea of a thing" is almost to invoke the allegorical process, for the idea transcends the thing, much as the allegorist's fiction departs from the literal sense of an utterance... More important is the Platonic arrangement of the theory of ideas as a vast hierarchical construct, from lower to higher forms... By questioning the essential value of material nature, the Platonic dialectic opens the way to a spiritualizing of nature, and in the case of Plato himself this leads to the use of allegory precisely at the moment in his dialogues when the analysis of nature has reached the highest point of transcendence describable in natural, human terms.

Many believe Plato was influenced by the Pythagoreans. Like other ancient sects, they were reputed to have secret doctrines and secret rituals. Ancient writers, however, especially associated them with 'symbols' used to conceal their secrets. The Pythagoreans seemed to extend the meaning of this term to include short phrases that played the role of secret passwords or answered ritualized riddles. Struck traces the way this usage was further stretched to encompass literary symbolism and thus why the Pythagoreans are sometimes credited with inventing such symbolism.

== Plato's early interpreters ==
Within the Academy, a famous dispute over the creation myth in Plato's Timaeus shows that some of Plato's earliest followers were not reading the dialogues literally: Speusippus, Xenocrates, and Polemo all interpreted a key passage in the Timaeus figuratively.

After Aristotle left the Academy and founded his own school, he did not seem to share the ambivalence toward allegoresis expressed in Plato's dialogues. He regarded the ancient Greek myths, for example, as allegorical expressions of philosophical truths:

An inheritance has been handed down from the most ancient to later times in the form of a myth, that there are gods and that the divine surrounds all of nature. The rest [of the ancient stories] were expressed mythically, which is appropriate for convincing uneducated people ... They even said the gods had human shapes and were similar to the other animals ... If the first [claim], that they believed the gods are fundamental realities, is taken separately [from the mythic stories], then they surely spoke an inspired truth ... (Met. 1074a38 – b13).

Yet when Aristotle discussed passages in Plato's dialogues he interpreted them literally. Aristotle's writings are hostile to Pythagoreanism and generally to unclear words in public speeches. Aristotle shows either that Plato's immediate students usually read the dialogues literally or that Aristotle himself was never initiated into the Pythagorean sect and thus missed the allegories later readers found in the dialogues.

In the two centuries following Plato's death in 347 BCE, there was sustained interest in Plato's philosophy but little surviving evidence of careful efforts among his early followers to interpret the dialogues (these do not, of course, purport to give Plato's own views). The first generations of 'dogmatists' after Plato in the early Academy were generally concerned with Plato's doctrines, arguments, and problems, but not with detailed readings of Plato's texts. Apparently no commentaries on the dialogues were written in the early Academy until Crantor (died about 290 BCE). The dogmatists were followed by 'skeptics' who interpreted the dialogues primarily as professions of Socratic ignorance. Dörrie points out that the notion of comprehensively interpreting Plato's texts had not yet emerged:

... the hermeneutical question [of how to interpret Plato's texts] was not posed ... Today, the demand that an interpretation must set out from an evaluation of the entirety (des gesamten Habitus) of a text would appear obvious and even banal. However, even in modern philology, this demand was first recognized as valid in the last two or at most three generations...

== The allegorical turn: Neo-Pythagoreanism ==
As interest in Plato spread from Athens to Alexandria and other cities across the Mediterranean, there was a turn from the doctrines espoused by the Academy toward the direct reading of the dialogues themselves. From this period onwards, the allegorical approach to reading Plato increasingly became the norm. This historic shift coincided with the resurgence of interest in Pythagoreanism about the first century BCE. Neo-Pythagoreans such as Numenius soon began claiming that Pythagorean doctrines were symbolically embedded in Plato's dialogues. One of Numenius' works was entitled On the Disagreement of the Academics with Plato and another On the Secrets or Reserved Doctrines in Plato. Tarrant summarized the views of the Neo-Pythagoreans, saying that they believed (italics original):

... that Pythagorean doctrines are hidden in Plato, who for one reason or another is reluctant to reveal them, and that true Pythagoreanism can be teased out of Platonic texts by in-depth interpretation... it would seem safe to say that something quite esoteric is regularly being detected beneath Plato's text, concealing details of the allegedly Pythagorean metaphysic that Pythagoreans, almost as a matter of faith, supposed to exist there.

Middle Platonism is sometimes thought to have avoided allegorical interpretation, but Dillon's survey found 'relative continuity' with the later Neo-Platonists: 'at least at the latter end of the Middle Platonic period, there were developments in exegesis which anticipated to some extent the allegorizing of the Neo-Platonists.' The routine attribution of hidden meanings to Plato among Middle Platonists can be found, for example, in Plutarch (c. 45 – 125 CE), a priest of the Elysian mysteries and perhaps a Platonic successor.

== Dominance of the allegorical Plato: Neo-Platonism ==
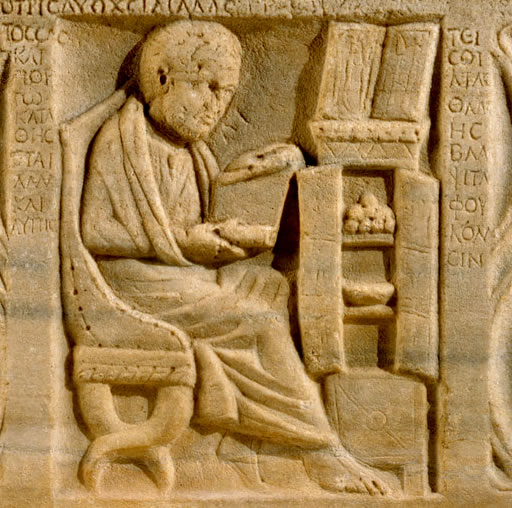
The earliest depiction of a Roman book cabinet or armarium, with scrolls inside on the upper shelf. From a sarcophagus dated to 200–300 CE, i.e., about the time Plotinus was in Rome. Though found in Ostia, a port near Rome, the Greek inscription suggests a Greek resident. The open case containing surgical tools on the cabinet top, the other scrolls, and a basin for bleeding patients within the cabinet suggest a learned physician (Metropolitan Museum of Art, N.Y., 48.76.1).

Modern historians call the followers of Plato in the early centuries CE 'Neo-Platonists.' They were the most important and vigorous advocates of the allegorical interpretation of Plato. Plotinus, regarded as the founder of Neo-Platonism, often says that Plato's dialogues have 'undermeanings' (hyponoiai). His Ennead III.5 is an extended allegorical interpretation of passages from Plato's Symposium.

Surviving commentaries on Plato's dialogues by Neo-Platonists such as Proclus contain extended allegorical interpretations. Proclus' commentary on Plato's Parmenides says, for example, that the narrator Antiphon could not have been ignorant of the dialogue's 'secret' or 'deeper meanings' (682). Proclus himself see the dialogue's characters as symbols of metaphysical principles: Parmenides is a representation of the divine, Zeno of the Intellect, and Socrates of the particular Intellect (628). Proclus argues generally that:

Writings of a genuinely profound and theoretical character ought not to be communicated except with the greatest caution and considered judgement, lest we inadvertently expose to the slovenly hearing and neglect of the public the inexpressible thoughts of god-like souls (718, cf. 1024).

Proclus claims that the Parmenides generally communicates its meaning through allegory or undermeanings. A teacher, he says, does not 'speak clearly, but will content himself with indications; for one should express mystical truths mystically and not publicize secret doctrines about the gods' (928). The dialogue's method of instruction is 'to employ symbols and indications and riddles, a method proper to the most mystical of doctrines ...' (1027).

A late neo-Platonist, Macrobius shows that in the fifth century CE allegorical interpretations of Plato were routine:

That is why Plato, when he was moved to speak about the Good, did not dare to tell what it was ... philosophers make use of fabulous narratives (fabulosa); not without a purpose, however, nor merely to entertain, but because they realize that a frank and naked (apertam nudamque) exposition of herself is distasteful to Nature, who, just as she has withheld an understanding of herself from the uncouth sense of men by enveloping herself in variegated garments, has also desired to have her secrets handled by more prudent individuals through fabulous narratives... Only eminent men of superior intelligence gain a revelation of her truths ... (I.17-18).

== Effects on Jewish, Christian, and Islamic hermeneutics ==
In the Hellenistic period (3rd – 1st centuries BCE) allegorical interpretation was predominately a Greek technique associated with interpreters of Homer, the Stoics, and finally Plato. Philo of Alexandria (c. 25 BCE – c. 50 CE), a Jewish scholar with a Greek education, systematically applied the allegorical approach to the Jewish scriptures. This had far-reaching consequences for later controversies over methods for interpreting the Christian Bible and these in turn set the stage for the modern rejection of allegorical interpretations of Plato.

Philo of Alexandria believed that the doctrines in Plato's dialogues and Jewish scriptures (the Torah) were so similar that Plato must have borrowed his philosophy from the Jews. Philo held that, before Plato wrote his dialogues, he must have traveled to Egypt and studied the teachings of the Jewish prophet Moses. Philo's wide-ranging, allegorical re-interpretations of Jewish scripture even found evidence that Plato's Theory of Forms was known centuries before Plato. Philo's theories had little immediate effect upon Jewish theologians, who seem never to have mentioned him or his voluminous writings.

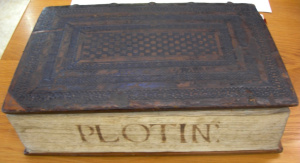
Oxford University's 1492 edition of Plotinus' Enneads, translated into Latin by Ficino, with its original stamped, checkerboard binding in calf over wooden boards. Holes for chain staples and the manuscript title on the text block show chained volumes were shelved with spines to the rear. This copy is thought to have belonged to the royal library of King Philip II of Spain.

Origen (184/185 – 253/254 CE) was 'the major scripture scholar in early Christianity ...' He adopted and extended the approach of Philo of Alexandria, and applied allegorical interpretation to the books of the Christian New Testament. Origen spent the first half of his career in Alexandria and knew Plato's writings well. Ramelli summarizes the relation between Philo and Origen:

Allegory was a powerful tool that allowed Philo to interpret [Jewish] Scripture in the light of Platonism... Origen tends expressly to refer to Philo as a predecessor precisely in points that are crucial to his Scriptural allegorical method. This strongly suggests that Philo was his main inspirer for the very technique of philosophical allegoresis of Scripture, and that Origen both was well aware of this and acknowledged his debt... Philo was the first systematic philosophical interpreter of the Bible who read it allegorically, and Origen was the first, and the greatest, who did so in Christianity.

Although Origen was a controversial figure, his influence on other, major Christian theologians such as Eusebius, Gregory of Nyssa, Ambrose, and Jerome was 'wide and deep.' Origen held that passages in the Bible had a literal sense and, in addition, two allegorical senses. This was later broadened, especially by the medieval Scholastics, into the famous doctrine that Biblical passages had a 'fourfold sense' – the literal, moral, allegorical, and anagogical. Lubac, in his three-volume work on the history of this technique, said 'the doctrine of the "fourfold sense," which had, from the dawn of the Middle Ages, been at the heart of [Biblical] exegesis, kept this role right to the end.' Protestants later complained that the Roman Catholic Church used allegory to make the Bible mean whatever it desired and thus to buttress the authority of the Church:

To maintain the fourfold sense was for mediaeval Romanism [that is, the Catholic Church] a matter of life and death. It was necessary for her power that dogmatic prepossession and traditional authority should reign supreme. The more ingeniously texts were manipulated in her interests, the more loudly she proclaimed that such interpretations alone were "spiritual " and were due to "illuminating grace."

In sum, the techniques of allegorical interpretation applied to Plato's dialogues became central to the European tradition of reading both philosophical and – after Philo's intervention – religious texts.

The degree to which Neo-Platonism and its allegorical methods influenced Muslim tradition is controversial and different scholars have different views. It is clear that the writings of Plotinus, Proclus, and other Neo-Platonists were translated into Arabic from an early date. Blending with local traditions, allegory and allegorical interpretation thereafter became central to Muslim philosophy, theology, and literature. To varying degrees, they influenced Muslim philosophical theologians such as Al-Kindi (d. c. 866), Al-Farabi (c. 870 – 950), Avicenna (980–1037), and Averroes (1126–1198). On the other hand, some verses in the Qur'an are regarded as allegorical and some see this as an early endorsement of allegory. Some Islamic sects, such as Sufism, are largely based on allegorical interpretation of the Qur'an.

== Renewed dominance of the allegorical Plato in the Renaissance: Ficino ==
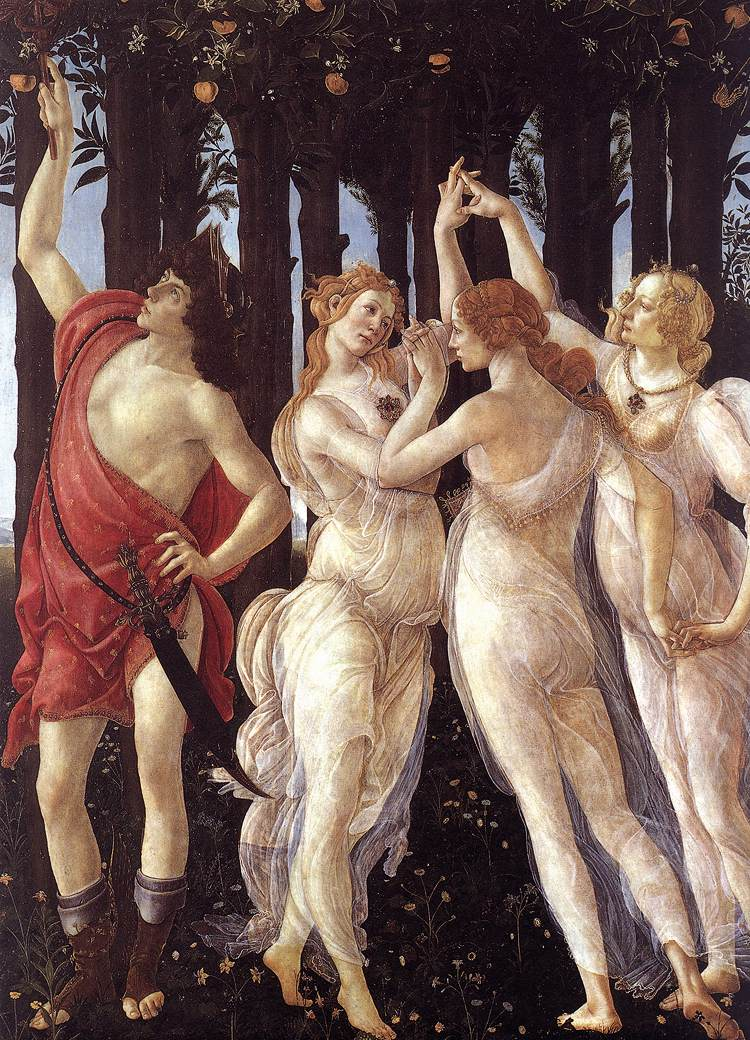
Botticelli's Primavera (detail, c. 1482). Florentine painters led the Renaissance shift from religious to pagan, allegorical themes. Lorenzo de' Medici was the patron of both Botticelli and Ficino, and extant letters suggest Ficino may have been consulted about the subjects of Botticelli's paintings.

Though almost all of Plato's dialogues were unavailable in Western Europe during the Middle Ages, Neo-Platonism and its allegorical philosophy became well-known through various channels:

All mediaeval thought up to the twelfth century was Neoplatonic rather than Aristotelian; and such popular authors of the Middle Ages as Augustine, Boethius, and the Pseudo-Dionysius carried Christian Neoplatonism to England as they did to all other parts of Western Europe.

From the Twelfth Century, the works of Aristotle became increasingly available and his philosophy came to dominate late medieval Scholasticism.

Plato's dialogues were preserved in the Byzantine Empire and Latin translations of individual dialogues began to appear in Italy early in the Renaissance. Marsilio Ficino (1433 – 1499) published the first complete translation in 1484 and this rapidly spread direct knowledge of Plato throughout Western Europe:

Their publication ... was an intellectual event of the first magnitude since they established Plato as a newly discovered authority for the Renaissance who could now take precedence over Aristotle, and whose work ... was of sufficient profundity to be set above his rival's.

Ficino's translations helped make Renaissance Platonism into 'an attacking progressive force besieging the conservative cultural fortress which defended the Aristotelianism of the Schoolmen ... the firmest support of the established order.'

Ficino's commentaries and translations ensured that the Neo-Platonist, allegorical approach to Plato became the norm throughout Western Europe. Ficino was reading Neo-Platonists such as Proclus as early as the 1460s. As Hankins said, Ficino, 'like the [neo-Platonic] allegorists believed that Plato had employed allegory as a device for hiding esoteric doctrines from the vulgar ...' His commentary on Plato's Phaedrus, for example, forthrightly interprets passages allegorically and acknowledges his debts to ancient Neo-Platonists:

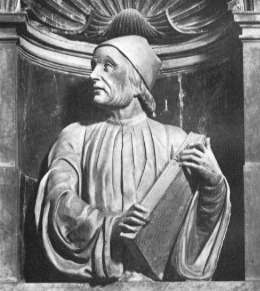
Bust of Marsilio Ficino in the cathedral in Florence (by A. Ferrucci, 1521). He seems to play his translation of Plato like a lyre.

The fable of the cicadas (230c) demands that we treat it as an allegory since higher things too, like poetic ones, are almost all allegorical... Thus it seemed to the Platonists, not only to [Neo-Platonists such as] Hermias but to Iamblichus too. In part, I follow in their footsteps, but in part I walk a crooked line based on probability and reason. Socrates himself, moreover, obviously feels the need for allegory here ...

Ficino's Christian, Neoplatonic and allegorical reading of Plato 'tended to shape the accepted interpretation of these works from the sixteenth to the eighteenth century.'

== The literalist turn: from Luther to Brucker ==
In the Sixteenth and Seventeenth Century, the Protestant Reformation and the religious wars that devastated much of Western Europe were in significant part about religious authority and therefore about how to interpret the Bible. Protestants charged that many Catholic traditions and doctrines (even the dogma that God was a Trinity) had no basis in the Gospels; Catholics asserted an expertise in reading the Bible that gave them special access to its deeper truths. The ancient technique of allegorical interpretation, the mainstay of Catholic exegesis, thus became a fiercely contested political issue. This controversy came later to transform the way Plato was read.

Martin Luther's famous slogan 'scripture alone' (sola scriptura) implied the text of the Bible could be read by itself without the Catholic Church's elaborate traditions of allegoresis. Together with other leading figures in the Reformation, Luther therefore attacked and rejected Catholic allegoresis:

... the most valuable of Luther's hermeneutical principles [was] his insistence on the primacy of the literal or grammatico-historical sense. He resolutely set aside the verbal legerdemain involved in the multiple exegesis of the Schoolmen, and firmly took his stand on the plain and obvious meaning of the Word... he emphatically urged the priority and superiority of the literal sense. For a thousand years the Church had buttressed its theological edifice by means of an authoritative exegesis which depended on allegory as its chief medium of interpretation. Luther struck a mortal blow at this vulnerable spot. From his own experience in the monastery he knew the futility of allegorisation – and stigmatised it as "mere jugglery," "a merry chase." "monkey tricks," and "looney talk."

Catholics responded at the Council of Trent that only the Church and its traditions could authoritatively interpret the meaning of the Bible.

The European wars of religion (16th – 17th c.) were in part about religious authority and whose interpretation of the Bible was legitimate, and thus allegory became a political issue. In just the Thirty Years War (1618–1648) there were perhaps five to ten million casualties and the German population was reduced in some regions by 25 to 40 percent. Depiction of the Battle of White Mountain, one of the decisive battles of the Thirty Years War, by Pieter Snayers (1620, Bayerisches Armeemuseum, Ingolstadt).

Protestant scholars began critical studies of the text of the Greek New Testament that led to a re-appraisal of all ancient literature. Protestants soon came to emphasize that the 'Alexandrians' or Neo-Platonists had introduced allegorical interpretation into Christianity, and thus hostility to allegory became hostility to Neo-Platonism. Violent disputes soon raged over whether the Neo-Platonists had corrupted the early Christian theologians and thus led the Church away from the 'pure' Christianity of the Gospels.

These theological controversies shaped modern classical scholarship. They are reflected in the great scholarly history of philosophy by Johann Jakob Brucker, his Critical History of Philosophy (1742–1744) that, for example, blames the Neo-Platonists for corrupting the Roman Catholic Church:

The Eclectic sect [of Neo-Platonists], thus raised upon the foundations of superstition, enthusiasm [i.e., mysticism], and imposture, proved the occasion of much confusion and mischief both to the Christian religion and philosophy... Pagan ideas and opinions were by degrees mixed with the pure and simple doctrine of the Gospel ... [and] corrupted the pure religion of Christ; and his church became a field of contention, and a nursery of error.

Brucker was openly contemptuous toward the Neo-Platonists: 'Lost in subtleties these pretenders to superior wisdom were perpetually endeavoring to explain by imaginary resemblances, and arbitrary distinctions, what they themselves probably never understood.' Brucker recognized that the Neo-Platonists thought of themselves simply as Platonists but denied this was the case:

The Eclectic sect [later called Neo-Platonists] is not commonly known among ancient writers under any distinct name; for this obvious reason, that its most celebrated supporters chose rather to pass themselves upon the world as Platonists, than to assume a new title; but that the sect really existed as such [as a separate sect with novel doctrines], no one, who attends to the facts ... can entertain a doubt... They endeavored to conceal the absurdities of the ancient [Pagan] religion by casting over its fables the veil of allegory, and thus represented them as founded upon immortal truths... the Alexandrian philosophers, though they founded their system chiefly upon the doctrine of Plato, departed from him in many particulars.

For Brucker, the allegorical commentators on Plato were 'mad, liars, impostors, vain and foolish forgers of a most detestable and false philosophy ...' Thus by the mid 1700s, allegorical interpretation was blamed on the Neo-Platonists and the Neo-Platonists were no longer Platonists.

Brucker's negative view of Neo-Platonism was spread across Europe by the French Encyclopedia of Diderot and D'Alembert, which labelled Neo-Platonism a 'superstition' in the article Eclectisme.

The decline of allegorical interpretations of Plato was part of a European-wide rejection of traditional allegory across literature, religion, and philosophy. During the Seventeenth and Eighteenth Centuries, '... allegory is forced out by the standard-bearers of modernity: empiricism, [rigorous] historiography, realism, and plain, rational speech... these shifts produced the end of allegory based on Platonic Ideas, Christian theology, or syncretic versions of these ...' Goethe (1749 – 1832) famously elevated the 'symbol' and denigrated allegory in his Maxims and Reflections. In classical scholarship, the work of Friedrich August Wolf (1759 – 1824) marks the final rejection of allegorical methods. He influentially advocated that classics should turn from literary methods and become a more rigorous 'science of antiquity' (Altertumswissenschaft).

== Rise of modern esotericism: Tennemann to the Tübingen School ==
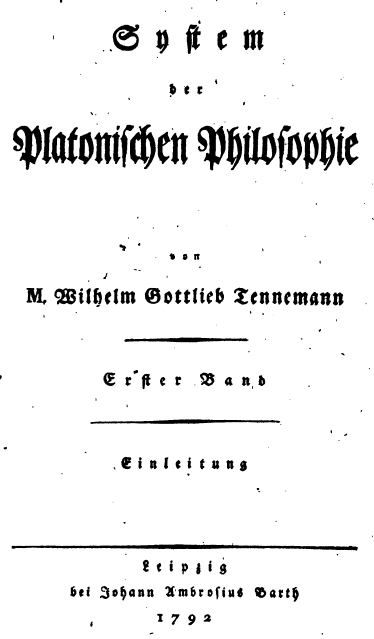
Tennemann, System of Platonic Philosophy (1792) Said to be the first, modern monograph on Plato, Tennemann's study interpreted Plato as a rationalist, and believed a logical, philosophical system lay concealed in the dialogues.

After early modern Protestant scholars ended the tradition of reading Plato allegorically, German philosophers developed new ways of finding deeper meanings in Plato. These 'modern esotericists' later assembled historical evidence that, they argued, showed that Plato expounded secret or esoteric doctrines orally that were transmitted through his students and their successors. These approaches reject ancient and Renaissance allegoresis but retain the distinction between the surface, literal meaning of the dialogues and Plato's concealed, esoteric doctrines.

Though Brucker rejected the allegories of the Neo-Platonists, he continued the tradition of regarding Plato as an esoteric writer who concealed his deeper philosophy. Brucker, however, made no attempt to reveal Plato's inner doctrines:

... among other things which Plato received from foreign philosophy, he was careful to borrow the art of concealing his real opinions. His inclination towards this kind of concealment appears from the obscure language which abounds in his writings, and may indeed be learned from his own express assertions. 'It is a difficult thing,' says he, 'to discover the nature of the Creator of the universe; and being discovered it is impossible, and would even be impious, to expose the discovery to vulgar understandings' (Timaeus, 28). ... [Plato] purposely threw a veil of obscurity over his public instructions, which was only removed for the benefit of those who were thought worthy of being admitted to his more private and confidential lectures. This concealed method of philosophizing he was induced to adopt from a regard to his personal safety, and from motives of vanity ...

The philosopher Wilhelm Gottlieb Tennemann (1761 – 1819) influentially denied that Plato was a mystic (Schwärmer) and portrayed him as a precursor to Enlightenment rationalism and Kant's philosophy. Echoing Luther's solo scriptura, Tennemann emphasized that Plato's dialogues were the 'only pure and clear source' for evidence about Plato's philosophy, and thus rejected the ancient allegorical commentaries. Like the Neo-Platonists, however, Tennemann argued at length that Plato did have a 'secret' or 'esoteric philosophy.' Drawing on the criticism of writing in Plato's Phaedrus and the Seventh Letter attributed to Plato, Tennemann asserted Plato had both practical and philosophical reasons for withholding his 'unwritten doctrines.' Tennemann finally laid out his grand project of close reading and comparisons between the dialogues that, he claimed, had enabled him to reconstruct much of Plato's lost esoteric philosophy. According to Tigerstedt,

Tennemann, not any classical author, is the real father of the modern Esoterists [sic]. He shares with them a positive and negative assumption: the belief that any philosopher worthy of the name has a system, and the rejection – whether articulate or understood – of the attempt of the Neoplatonists to find their own system in Plato's writings. It is the combination of these two assumptions that has given birth to the modern Esoteric interpretation of Plato.'

The renowned Protestant theologian Friedrich Schleiermacher (1768 – 1834), sometimes known as the 'founder of hermeneutics,' published translations of Plato's dialogues that were long standard in Germany and reinforced the German search for Plato's esoteric philosophy through new kinds of subtle interpretation. Schleiermacher's influential 'General Introduction' to his Plato translations rejected ancient esoteric interpretations of Plato but praised and extended Tennemann's rationalist esotericism. Writing during the rise of German romanticism, Schleiermacher argued that Tennemann's 'analytic' dissection of Plato needed to be supplemented by a more romantic or psychological, holistic interpretation of Plato's entire oeuvre:

... to that analytical exposition [of Tennemann's] which we now have been in possession of for a short time, in perfection far exceeding former attempts, it is a necessary supplementary process to restore to their natural connection those limbs, [the dialogues,] ... as expositions continuously more complete as they advance ... so that while every dialogue is taken not only as a whole in itself but also in its connection with the rest ... [Plato] may at last be understood as a Philosopher and a perfect Artist.

This required a kind of subtle interpretation since, in Plato, '... the real investigation is overdrawn with another, not like a veil, but, as it were, an adhesive skin, which conceals from the inattentive reader ... the matter which is to be properly considered or discovered ...'

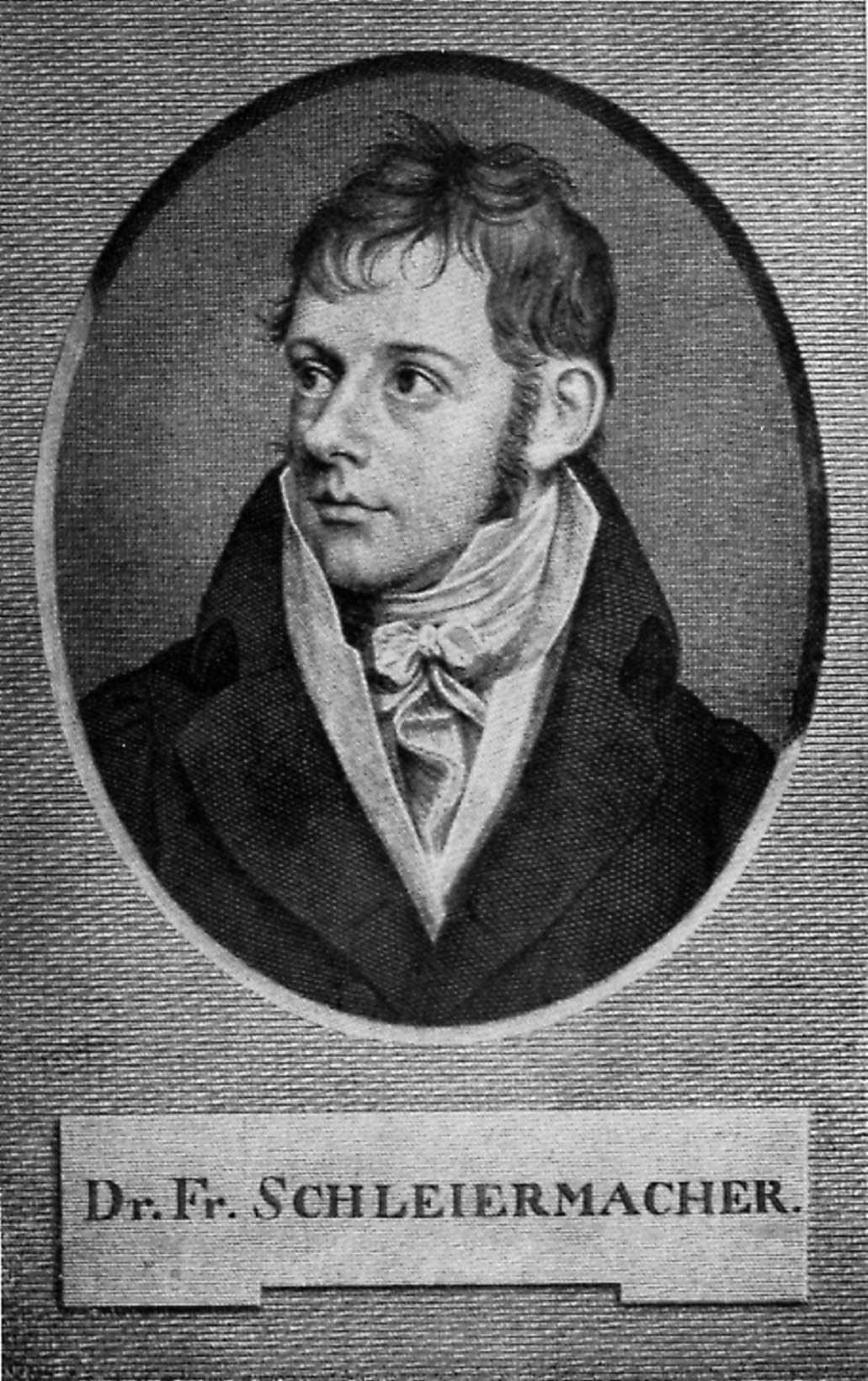
An engraving of Schleiermacher from his early adulthood.

In the middle of the twentieth century, the so-called Tübingen School, initiated by the German scholars Hans Joachim Krämer and Konrad Gaiser, pushed esoteric interpretations of Plato in a novel direction. It is well-known that Aristotle refers to Plato's 'unwritten teachings' and that Plato's followers attribute metaphysical theories to him that are not spelled out in the dialogues. The Tübingen School collects further references to these metaphysical theories from later in antiquity and concludes that Plato did in fact have a systematic, oral teaching that he kept out of the dialogues. This is esoteric in the literal sense: Plato taught it within the walls of his school. These oral teachings were supposedly transmitted down through the centuries, and this accounts for the reliability of the evidence from late antiquity.

The Tübingen School was famously attacked by the prominent American scholars Harold F. Cherniss and Gregory Vlastos and English-speaking scholars thereafter tended to be skeptical. In 1974, however, Findlay published Plato: The Written and Unwritten Doctrines that similarly used evidence from the Neo-Platonists to discern Plato's unwritten doctrines. In 1983, Kenneth Sayre argued that the dialogues properly interpreted contained definite allusions to Plato's esoteric metaphysics. Adherents of the Tübingen School are common in Germany and Italy but in 2012 Nikulin remarked '... the majority of the scholars in the Anglo-American world remain unconvinced that the Tübingen interpretation offered a glimpse into the historical Plato.' John Dillon, however, has argued for a moderate view. He accepts the early evidence that Plato had a more elaborate metaphysics than appears in the dialogues, but doubts there was any continuous, oral transmission in later centuries.

The influential American philosopher and political theorist Leo Strauss learned about the esoteric interpretations of Plato as a student in Germany. His Persecution and the Art of Writing extended them into the controversial view that philosophical writing generally contained concealed meanings that could be discovered by 'reading between the lines.'

== Rise of revisionism: Dodds, Tigerstedt, and Kahn ==
For several centuries after the Protestant Reformation, Neo-Platonism was condemned as a decadent and 'oriental' distortion of Platonism. In a famous 1929 essay, E. R. Dodds showed that key conceptions of Neo-Platonism could be traced from their origin in Plato's dialogues, through his immediate followers (e.g., Speusippus) and the Neo-Pythagoreans, to Plotinus and the Neo-Platonists. Thus Plotinus' philosophy was 'not the starting-point of Neo-Platonism but its intellectual culmination.' Further research reinforced this view and by 1954 Merlan could say 'The present tendency is toward bridging rather than widening the gap separating Platonism from Neo-Platonism.'

E. N. Tigerstedt's history of the Reformation's separation of Neo-Platonism from Platonism concluded that its motives were theological and so illegitimate: '... many theologians, most but not all of them Protestants, were highly suspicious of the evil influence of Platonism on Christian theology ... the separation of Platonism from Neo-Platonism seems to have been inspired by the wish to dissociate Plato from his later followers, who were regarded as anti-Christian, and thus maintain the venerable view of Plato as anima naturaliter Christiana ['a natural Christian soul'].' In 2013, Catana argued

...the divide between Middle Platonism and Neoplatonism is justified on the part of Brucker by means of assumptions that are untenable. Hence it becomes very difficult to maintain a divide between the two periods ... I think we ought to abandon the divide completely, since it cannot be justified in the essentialistic manner proposed by Brucker. Given the fact that the division obscures more than it reveals, we would be better off without it.

Thus recent scholarship has transformed Neo-Platonism from an aberration that could be ignored into a phase of Platonism.

In 1996, the prominent American scholar, Charles Kahn, advocated an 'ingressive interpretation' that reads beneath the surface and finds Neo-Platonic themes within Plato's dialogues:

Why so much deviousness on Plato's part? Why do dialogues ... obscurely hint at doctrines ...? In the case of Plato, his lifetime loyalty to the dialogue form suggests a temperamental aversion to direct statement, reinforced by much reflection on the obstacles to successful communication for philosophical insight... [Plato's indirect and subtle,] ingressive mode of exposition has, I suggest, been chosen by Plato because of his acute sense of the psychological distance that separates his world view from that of his audience... Plato's metaphysical vision ... is recognizably that of Plotinus and the Neoplatonists ...

== See also ==
- Allegorical interpretation of the Bible
- Allegory
- Harold F. Cherniss, for the Cherniss-Vlastos critique of the Tübingen school
- Platonism
- Plato's unwritten doctrines, debate over Plato's esotericism
