= Johann Jakob Brucker =

German historian of philosophy (1696–1770)

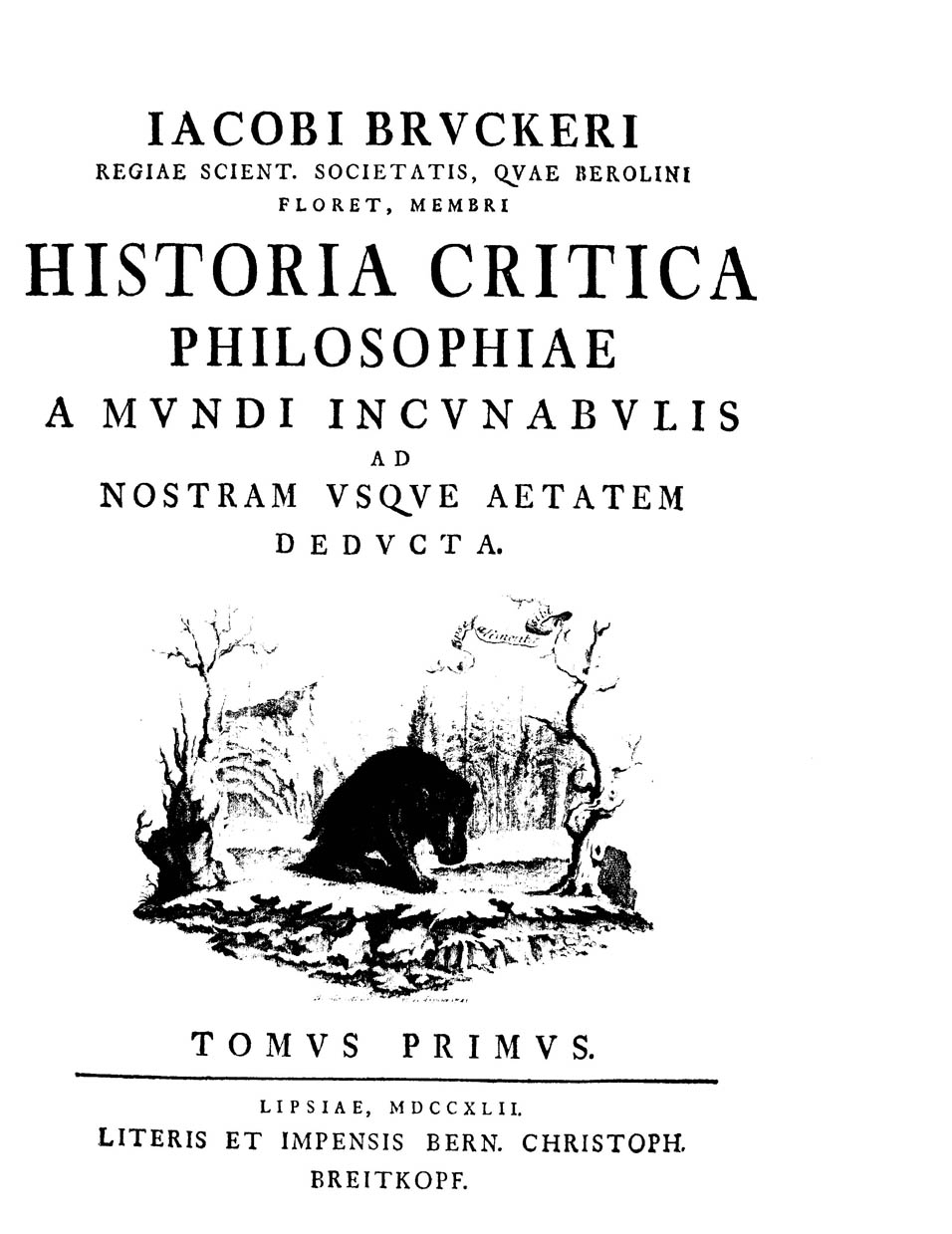
Historia critica philosophiae, 1742

Johann Jakob Brucker (German: [ˈbʀʊkɐ]; Latin: Jacobus Bruckerus; 22 January 1696 – 26 November 1770) was a German historian of philosophy whose work is widely regarded as foundational to modern historiography of philosophy.

== Life ==
He was born in Augsburg. He was initially destined for the Lutheran ministry and graduated from the University of Jena in 1718. He returned to Augsburg in 1720, but became parish minister of Kaufbeuren in 1723.

In 1731 he was elected a member of the Academy of Sciences at Berlin, and was invited to return again to Augsburg as pastor and senior minister of the Church of St. Ulrich.

He died in Augsburg.

== Works ==
His chief work, Historia Critica Philosophiae ("Critical History of Philosophy"), appeared at Leipzig (originally 5 volumes, 1742–1744). Its success was such that a new edition was published in six volumes (1766–1767; English translation by William Enfield, 1791). It is primarily by this work alone that Brucker is now known, and was the modern era's first complete history of the different philosophical schools. It embodies an ample collection of materials, and contains valuable biographies. Schopenhauer in his advice to read the original writings of philosophers, praised Brucker. He wrote that "Their real study demands all of a long and studious life, such as the stout-hearted Brucker formerly devoted to them in the industrious times of old (Parerga and Paralipomena, Volume 1, "Fragments for the History of Philosophy," § 1)." The Historia is also credited as a major influence on Immanuel Kant and the development of his doctrine of "ideas" and the "perfect republic" in the Critique of Pure Reason.

He also wrote Tentamen Introductionis in Historiam Doctrinae de Ideis, afterwards completed and republished under the title of Historia Philosophicae Doctrinae de Ideis (Augsburg, 1723); Otium Vindelicum (1731); Kurze Fragen aus der philosophischen Historiae (7 volumes, Ulm, 1731–1736), a history of philosophy in question and answer, containing many details, especially in the department of literary history, which he omitted in his chief work; Pinacotheca Scriptorum nostra aetate literis illustrium, etc. (Augsburg, 1741–1755); Ehrentempel der deutschen Gelehrsamkeit (Augsburg, 1747–1749); Institutiones Historiae Philosophicae (Leipzig, 1747 and 1756; 3rd edition with a continuation by F. G. B. Born (1743–1807) of Leipzig, in 1790); Miscellanea Historiae Philosophicae Literariae Criticae olim sparsim edita (Augsburg, 1748); Erste Anfangsgründe der philosophischen Geschichte (Ulm, 1751). He superintended an edition of Martin Luther's translation of the Old and New Testament, with a commentary extracted from the writings of the English theologians (Leipzig, 1758–1770, completed by V. A. Teller).

== Legacy ==
Brucker has been called "the father of modern historiography of philosophy." Scholars have credited his work with shaping the modern discipline of the history of philosophy, and have labeled him "the first person to methodically structure the history of philosophy."

== See also ==
- Allegorical interpretations of Plato
