= William J. Prior =

American philosopher (1946–2026)

- Born: May 16, 1946; Rutland, Vermont, U.S.
- Died: April 23, 2026 (aged 79)
- Children: 4

Academic background
- Education: Michigan State University (BA), University of Texas (PhD)

Academic work
- Discipline: Philosophy
- Institutions: Santa Clara University; University of Colorado Boulder
- Main interests: ancient philosophy, virtue ethics

William J. Prior (May 16, 1946 – April 23, 2026) was an American philosopher and academic who was a professor of philosophy at Santa Clara University. He is best known for his work on ancient Greek philosophy, especially on Socrates and Plato.

== Biography ==
Born in Rutland, Vermont, Prior graduated from Michigan State University in 1968. He earned his philosophy PhD in 1975 from the University of Texas at Austin and taught for 11 years at the University of Colorado Boulder. During this time, he also held visiting positions at the Institute for Research in the Humanities at University of Wisconsin-Madison and at the University of Virginia and at UCLA. He arrived at Santa Clara in 1986, and taught there for 27 years before retiring in 2013 as professor emeritus.

Prior died on April 23, 2026, at the age of 79.

== Books ==
- Unity and Development in Plato's Metaphysics (La Salle, Illinois: Open Court Publishing Company, and Beckenham, Kent: Croom Helm Ltd., 1985); reprinted by Routledge in 2013
- Virtue and Knowledge: An Introduction to Ancient Greek Ethics (London and New York: Routledge, Chapman and Hall, inc., 1991); reprinted by Routledge in 2016.
- Ancient Philosophy: A Beginner's Guide (London: Oneworld Publications, 2016)

=== Edited ===
- Logos, volume 9: Manufactured Motherhood: The Ethics of the New Reproductive Techniques (Santa Clara, CA: Santa Clara Department of Philosophy, 1988)
- Logos, volume 10: Reason and Moral Judgment (Santa Clara, California: Santa Clara Department of Philosophy, 1989)
- Logos, volume 11: Personal Identity (Santa Clara, California: Santa Clara Department of Philosophy, 1990)
- Socrates: Critical Assessments of Leading Philosophers (4 volumes. London and New York: Routledge, 1996)
