= Plato's unwritten doctrines =

Metaphysical theories ascribed to Plato

Plato's unwritten doctrines are metaphysical theories ascribed to him by his students and other ancient philosophers but not clearly formulated in his writings. In recent research, they are sometimes known as Plato's 'principle theory' (German: Prinzipienlehre) because they involve two fundamental principles from which the rest of the system derives.

The main sources ascribing esoteric doctrines to Plato are first-generation members of his Academy, most notably Aristotle. These sources indicate that Plato believed certain parts of his teachings could not be explained in writing in a way that would be accessible to general readers; therefore, he restricted their teaching to students in the Academy.

In the middle of the twentieth century, historians of philosophy initiated a wide-ranging project aiming at systematically reconstructing the foundations of the unwritten doctrines. The group of researchers who led this investigation came to be called the 'Tübingen School' (in German: Tübinger Platonschule), because some of its leading members were based at the University of Tübingen in southern Germany. While its advocates have described the Tübingen reconstruction as a 'paradigm shift' in Plato studies, critics of the Tübingen School have argued that the available evidence is insufficient to establish that Plato deliberately withheld a systematic metaphysical doctrine from his written dialogues.

== Key terms ==
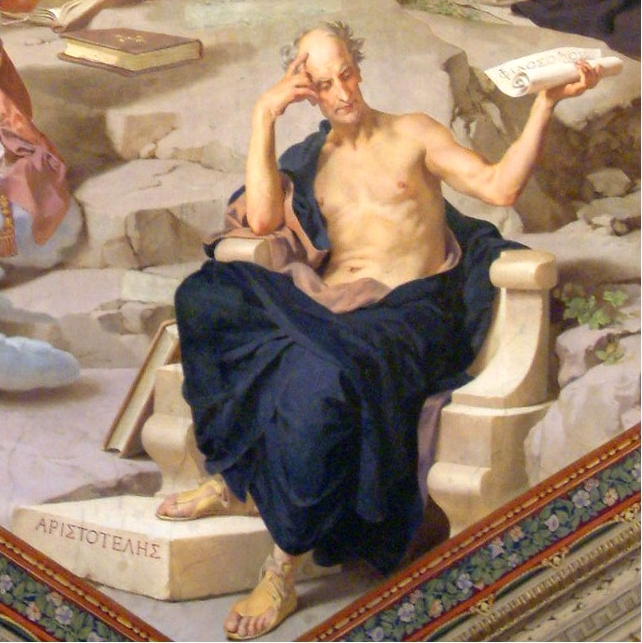
Aristotle referred to Plato's 'unwritten doctrines' and discussed Plato's principle theory.

The expression 'unwritten doctrines' (in Greek: ἄγραφα δόγματα, ágrapha dógmata) refers to doctrines of Plato taught inside his school and was first used by his student Aristotle. In his treatise on physics, he wrote that Plato had used a concept in one dialogue differently than 'in the so-called unwritten doctrines.' Modern scholars who defend the authenticity of the unwritten doctrines ascribed to Plato lay stress on this ancient expression. They hold that Aristotle used the phrase 'so-called' not in any ironic sense, but neutrally.

The scholarly literature sometimes also uses the term 'esoteric doctrines.' This has nothing to do with the meanings of 'esoteric' common today: it does not indicate a secret doctrine. For scholars, 'esoteric' indicates only that the unwritten doctrines were intended for a circle of philosophy students inside Plato's school (in Greek, 'esoteric' literally means 'inside the walls'). Presumably they had the necessary preparation and had already studied Plato's published doctrines, especially his Theory of Forms, which is called his 'exoteric doctrine' ('exoteric' means 'outside the walls' or perhaps 'for public consumption').

Modern advocates of the possibility of reconstructing the unwritten doctrines are often called in a short and casual way 'esotericists' and their skeptical opponents are thus 'anti-esotericists.'

The Tübingen School is sometimes called the Tübingen School of Plato studies to distinguish it from an earlier 'Tübingen School' of theologians based at the same university. Some also refer to the 'Tübingen paradigm.' Since Plato's unwritten doctrines were also vigorously defended by the Italian scholar Giovanni Reale, who taught in Milan, some also refer to the 'Tübingen and Milanese School' of Plato interpretation. Reale introduced the term 'protology,' i.e., 'doctrine of the One,' for the unwritten doctrines, since the highest of the principles ascribed to Plato is known as the 'One.'

== Evidence and sources ==
The case for the unwritten doctrines involves two steps. The first step consists in the presentation of the direct and circumstantial evidence for the existence of special philosophical doctrines taught orally by Plato. This, it is claimed, shows that Plato's dialogues, which have all survived, do not contain all of his teaching, but only those doctrines suitable for dissemination by written texts. In the second step, the range of sources for the supposed content of the unwritten doctrines is evaluated and the attempt made to reconstruct a coherent philosophical system.

=== Arguments for the existence of the unwritten doctrines ===
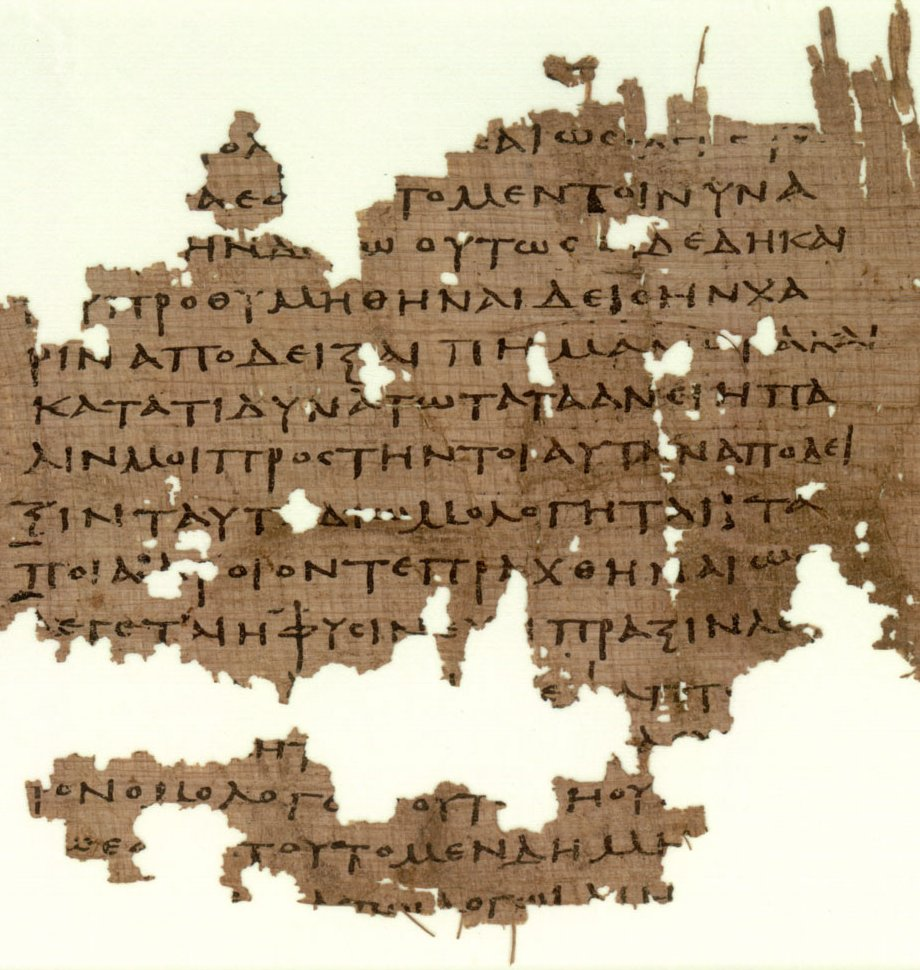
Papirus Oxyrhynchus, with fragment of Plato's Republic

The chief evidence and arguments for the existence of Plato's unwritten doctrines are the following:

- Passages in Aristotle's Metaphysics and Physics, especially the one in the Physics where Aristotle explicitly refers to the 'so-called unwritten doctrines.' Aristotle was for many years a student of Plato, and it is assumed that he was well-acquainted with the teaching activity in the Academy and thus a good informant.
- The report of Aristoxenus, a student of Aristotle, about Plato's public lecture 'On the Good.' According to Aristoxenus, Aristotle told him that the lecture contained mathematical and astronomical illustrations and Plato's theme was the 'One,' his highest principle. This together with the title of the lecture implies it dealt with the two principles at the heart of the unwritten doctrines. According to Aristotle's report, the philosophically unprepared audience met the lecture with incomprehension.

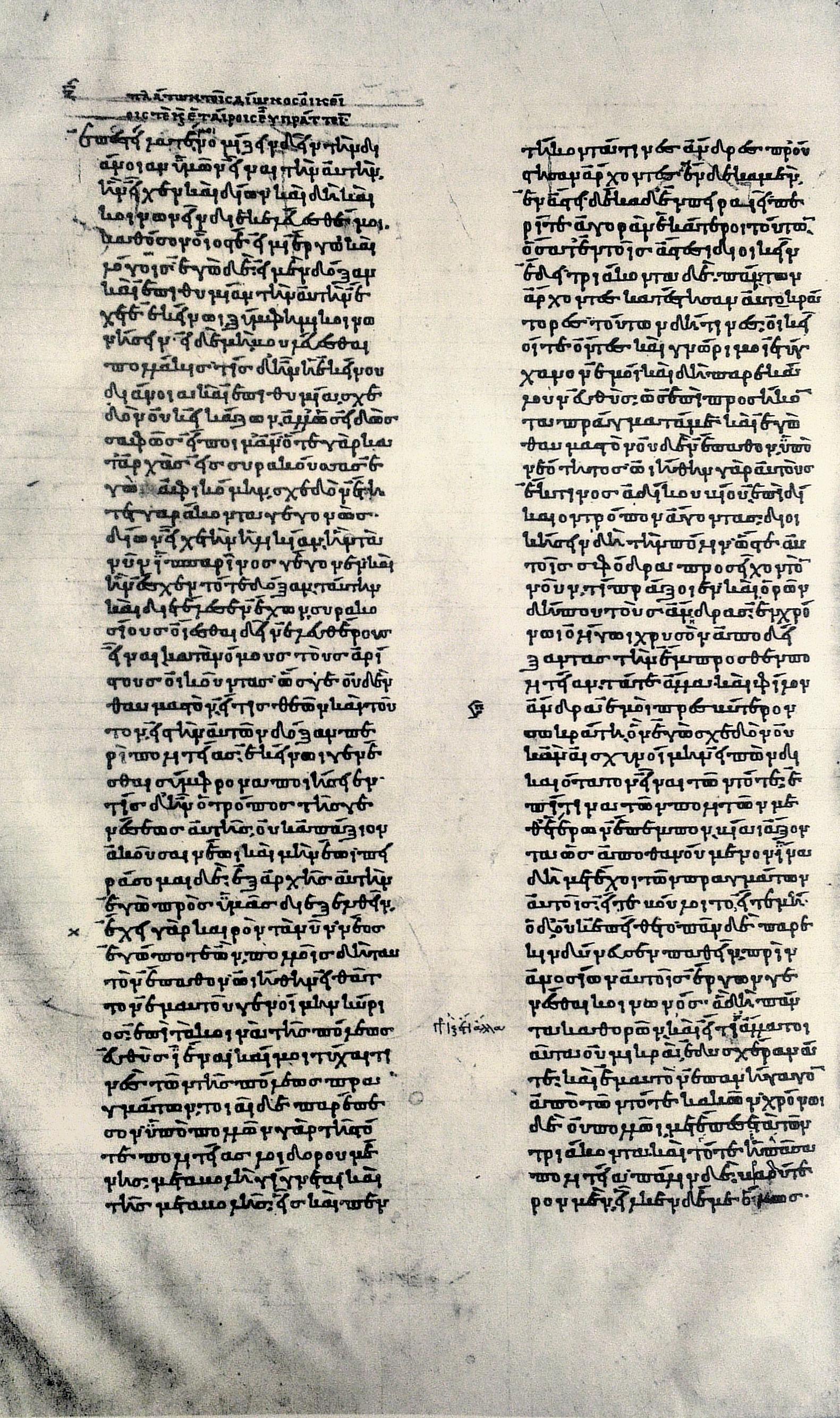
The beginning of the Seventh Letter in the oldest, surviving manuscript from the ninth century CE (Paris, Bibliothèque Nationale, Gr. 1807)

- The criticism of writing in Plato's dialogues (German: Schriftkritik). Many dialogues accepted as authentic are skeptical about the written word as a medium for transferring knowledge and express a preference for oral transmission. Plato's Phaedrus explains this position in detail. There the superiority of oral over written teaching for transmitting philosophy is grounded in the far greater flexibility of oral discourse, which is held to be a decisive advantage. Authors of texts cannot adapt to the level of knowledge and the needs of individual readers. Moreover, they cannot answer readers' questions and criticisms. These are only possible in conversation, which is alive and psychologically responsive. Written texts are mere images of speech. Writing and reading are thought not only to lead to a weakening of our minds, but also to be unsuited for communicating wisdom, which can only succeed in oral instruction. Written words are useful only as reminders for those who already know something but may have forgotten it. Literary activity is therefore portrayed as mere play. Personal discussions with students are essential and may permit words in various individualized ways to be inscribed in the soul. Only those who can teach in this way, the Phaedrus continues, can be considered true philosophers. In contrast, those authors who have nothing 'more precious' (Gk., timiōtera) than a written text, which they have long polished, are only authors or writers but not yet philosophers. The meaning here of the Greek for 'more precious' is debated but is thought to point toward the unwritten doctrines.
- The criticism of writing in Plato's Seventh Letter, whose authenticity is contested, is nonetheless accepted by the Tübingen School. There Plato asserts—if he is really the author—that his teaching can only be communicated orally (at least, he says, that part of it, he is 'serious' about). He emphatically says that there is no text capable of expressing his philosophy and never will be, since it cannot be communicated like other teachings. Real understanding in the soul, the letter continues, arises only from intense, common effort and a shared path in life. Deep insights occur suddenly, the way a spark flies up and lights a fire. Fixing thought in writing is damaging since it produces illusions in the minds of readers, who either despise what they do not understand or become arrogant about their superficial learning.
- The 'doctrine of reserve' in the dialogues. There are numerous passages in the dialogues in which an especially important theme is introduced but then not further discussed. In many cases, the conversation breaks off just where it approaches the crux of the issue. These often concern questions which are of fundamental significance for philosophy. The Tübingen School interprets these instances of 'reserve' as pointers to the content of the unwritten doctrines, which cannot be directly handled in written dialogues.
- The fact that it was common in Antiquity to distinguish between 'exoteric' matters, suitable for open and public discussion, and 'esoteric' matters, suitable only for instruction within a school. Even Aristotle employed this distinction.
- The widespread view in Antiquity that the content of Plato's doctrines that had been reserved for oral transmission went significantly beyond the philosophy expressed in the dialogues.
- The unwritten doctrines are thought to be the logical consequence of Plato's supposed project of reducing multiplicity to unity and particularity to generality. Plato's Theory of Forms reduces the multiplicity of appearances to the relatively smaller multiplicity of the Forms that are their foundation. Within Plato's hierarchy of Forms, the many lower-level Forms of the species derive from and depend on the higher and more general Forms of each genus. This leads to the supposition that the introduction of Forms was only a step on the way from the maximum multiplicity of appearances to the greatest possible unity. Plato's thought naturally leads therefore to the consequence that the reduction of multiplicity to unity must be brought to a conclusion, and this must occur in the unpublished theory of his highest principles.

=== The ancient sources for the reconstruction ===
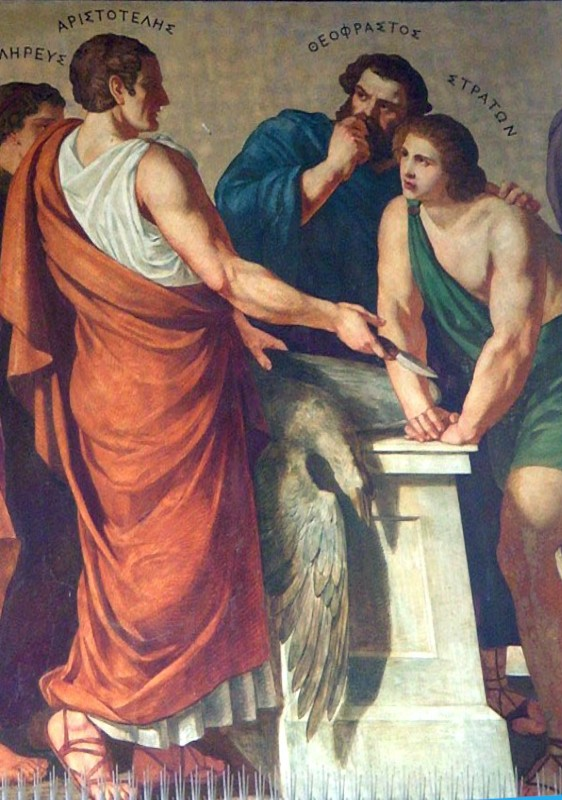
Aristotle, his student Theophrastus, and Strato of Lampsacus (National and Kapodistrian University of Athens)

If the Seventh Letter is authentic, Plato sharply disapproved of disclosing the contents of the supposed unwritten doctrines in writing. However, no obligation to remain silent was imposed upon the 'initiated.' The 'esoteric' character of the teachings should not be understood as a requirement to keep them secret or as a ban on writing about them. Indeed, students in the Academy did later publish writings about the unwritten doctrines or reuse them in their own works. This 'indirect tradition,' the evidence drawn from other ancient authors, supplies a basis for the reconstruction of doctrines that Plato communicated only orally.

The following sources are most frequently used for reconstructing Plato's unwritten doctrines:

- Aristotle's Metaphysics (books Α, Μ and N) and Physics (book Δ)
- Fragments of Aristotle's lost treatises 'On the Good' and 'On Philosophy'
- The Metaphysics of Theophrastus, a student of Aristotle
- Two fragments of the lost treatise On Plato by Plato's student Hermodorus of Syracuse
- A fragment from a lost work of Plato's student Speusippus
- The treatise Against the Physicists by the Pyrrhonist philosopher Sextus Empiricus. Sextus describes these doctrines as Pythagorean; however, modern scholars have assembled evidence that Plato was their author.
- Plato's Republic and Parmenides. The principles ascribed to Plato in the indirect tradition make many of the statements and trains of thought in these two dialogues appear in a different light. Interpreted accordingly, they contribute to sharpening the contours of our image of the unwritten doctrines. The debates in other dialogues, for example, the Timaeus and the Philebus, can then be understood in new ways and incorporated into the Tübingen reconstruction. Allusions to the unwritten doctrines can even be found, it is argued, in Plato's early dialogues.

== The supposed content of the unwritten doctrines ==
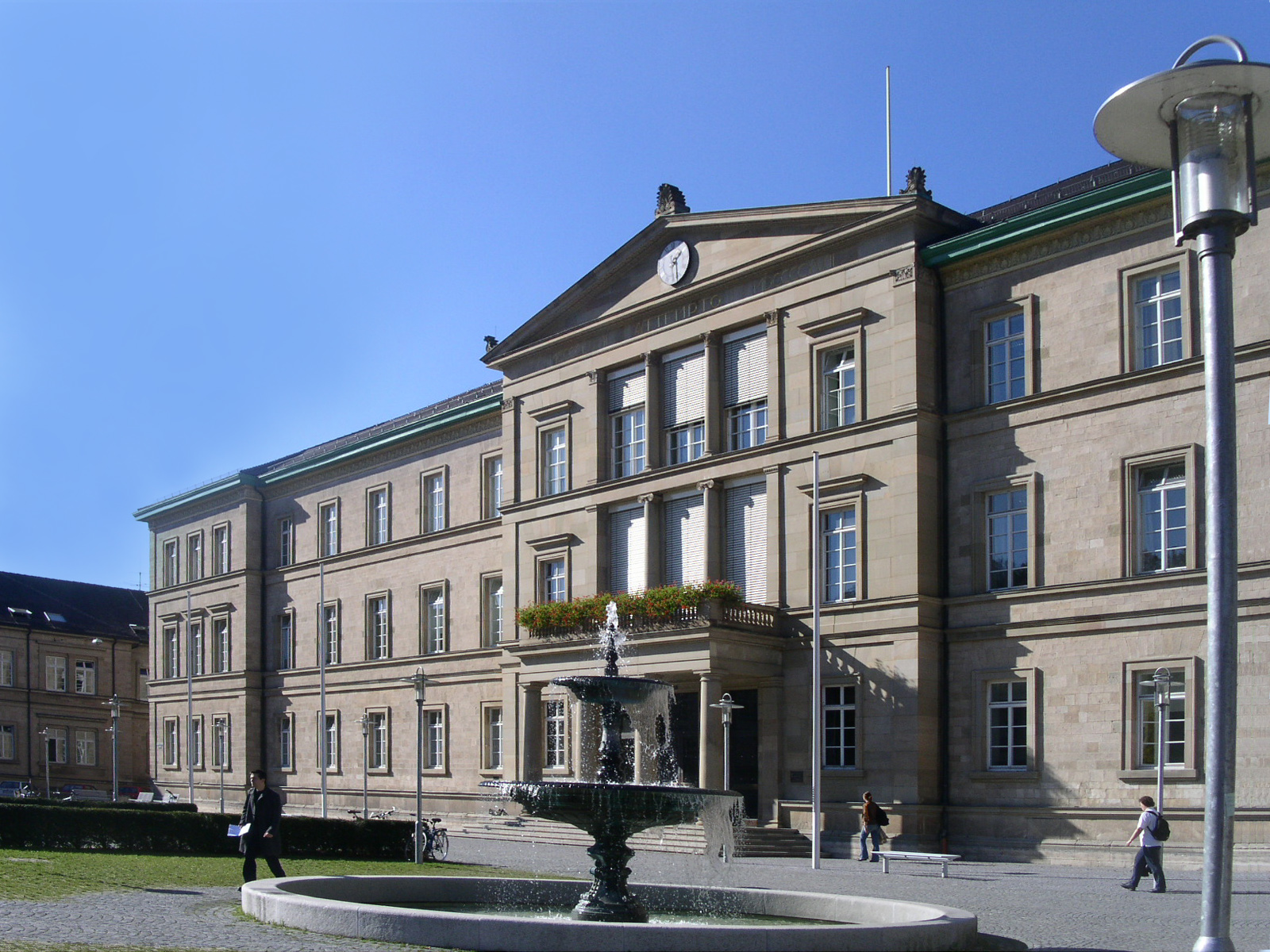
Scholars at the University of Tübingen revolutionized the study of Plato's unwritten doctrines.

The advocates of the Tübingen School have intensively examined the scattered evidence and testimony in the sources in order to reconstruct the principles of Plato's unwritten doctrines. They see in these teachings the core of Plato's philosophy and have reached a fairly settled picture of their fundamentals, though many important details remain unknown or controversial. A notable feature of the Tübingen paradigm is the contention that the unwritten doctrines are not unrelated to the written doctrines, rather there is a close and logical connection between them.

Insofar as the Tübingen interpretation corresponds to the authentic teaching of Plato, it shows that his principles opened up a new path in metaphysics. His Theory of Forms opposes many views of the Eleatics, a school of Pre-Socratic philosophy. The principles at the foundation of Plato's unwritten doctrines indeed break with the convictions of the Eleatics, who held that only perfect, unchanging Being exists. Plato's principles replace this Being with a new concept of Absolute Transcendence, that is somehow higher than Being. They posit a sphere of absolutely perfect, 'Transcendental Being' beyond the being of ordinary things. 'Transcendental Being' thus somehow exists at a higher level than ordinary things. According to this model, all familiar kinds of being are in a certain way imperfect, since the descent from Transcendental Being to ordinary being involves a restriction of the original, absolute perfection.

=== The two fundamental principles and their interaction ===
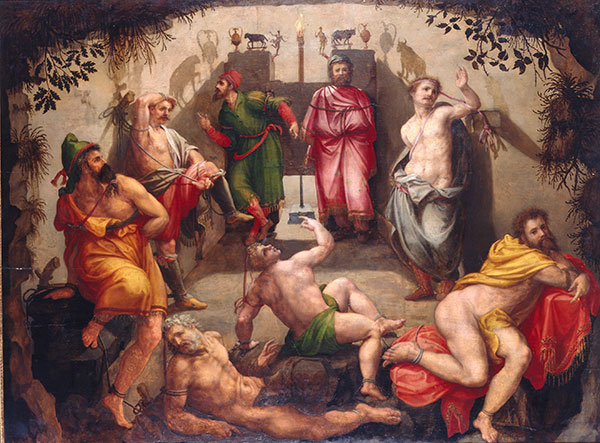
In Plato's Allegory of the Cave, we are like prisoners chained in a cave who see only the shadows cast by the Forms and think the shadows, rather than the hidden Forms, are real. Painting of Plato's cave by Michiel Coxie, c. 1540.

Plato's Theory of Forms asserts that the world which appears to our senses derives from the perfect, unchanging Forms. For him the realm of the Forms is an objective, metaphysical reality, which is independent of the lower sort of Being in the ordinary objects we perceive with our senses. For Plato, the Forms, not the objects of sense, are real Being: strictly, they and not the objects we experience are reality. Thus the Forms are the really existing things. As models for the individual objects we sense, the Forms cause ordinary objects to appear the way they do and lend them some secondary kind of existence.

Just as the Theory of Forms in Plato's published dialogues is supposed to explain the existence and features of the world of appearances, the two principles of the unwritten doctrines are supposed to explain the existence and features of the realm of the Forms. The Theory of Forms and the principles of the unwritten doctrines fit together in a way that provides a unified theory of all existence. The existence of the Forms as well as the objects we sense are derived from two fundamental principles.

The two fundamental primordial principles (Urprinzipien) that are thought to constitute the basis of Plato's unwritten doctrines are :

- The One: the principle of unity that makes things definite and determinate
- The Indefinite Dyad: the principle of 'indeterminacy' and 'unlimitedness' (Gk., ahóristos dyás)

Plato is said to have described the Indefinite Dyad as 'the Great and the Small' (Gk., to méga kai to mikrón). This is the principle or source of more and less, of excess and deficiency, of ambiguity and indefiniteness, and of multiplicity. It does not imply unlimitedness in the sense of a spatial or quantitative infinity; instead, the indefiniteness consists in a lack of determinateness and therefore of fixed form. The Dyad is called 'indefinite' to distinguish it from definite two-ness, i.e., the number two, and to indicate that the Dyad stands above mathematics.

The One and the Indefinite Dyad are the ultimate ground of everything because the realm of Plato's Forms and the totality of reality derive from their interaction. The whole manifold of sensory phenomena rests in the end on only two factors. Form issues from the One, which is the productive factor; the formless Indefinite Dyad serves as the substrate for the activity of the One. Without such a substrate, the One could produce nothing. All Being rests upon the action of the One upon the Indefinite Dyad. This action sets limits to the formless, gives it Form and particularity, and is therefore also the principle of individuation that brings separate entities into existence. A mixture of both principles underlies all Being.

Depending upon which principle dominates in a thing, either order or disorder reigns. The more chaotic something is, the more strongly the presence of the Indefinite Dyad is at work.

According to the Tübingen interpretation, the two opposing principles determine not only the ontology of Plato's system, but also its logic, ethics, epistemology, political philosophy, cosmology, and psychology. In ontology the opposition of the two principles corresponds to the opposition between Being and Not-Being. The more the Indefinite Dyad influences a thing, the less it has of Being and the lower its ontological rank. In logic, the One supplies identity and equality, while the Indefinite Dyad supplies difference and inequality. In ethics, the One signifies Goodness (or virtue, aretḗ), while the Indefinite Dyad signifies Badness. In politics, the One gives to a populace that which makes it into a unified political entity and enables it to survive, while the Indefinite Dyad leads to faction, chaos, and dissolution. In cosmology, the One is evidenced by rest, persistence, and the eternality of the world, as well as the presence of life in the cosmos and the pre-determined activity of the Demiurge Plato mentions in his Timaeus. The Indefinite Dyad is in cosmology the principle of movement and change, and especially of impermanence and death. In epistemology, the One stands for philosophical knowledge that rests upon acquaintance with Plato's unchanging Forms, while the Indefinite Dyad stands for mere opinion that is dependent upon sensory impressions. In psychology or the theory of the soul, the One corresponds to Reason, and the Indefinite Dyad to the sphere of instinct and bodily affects.

=== Monism and dualism ===
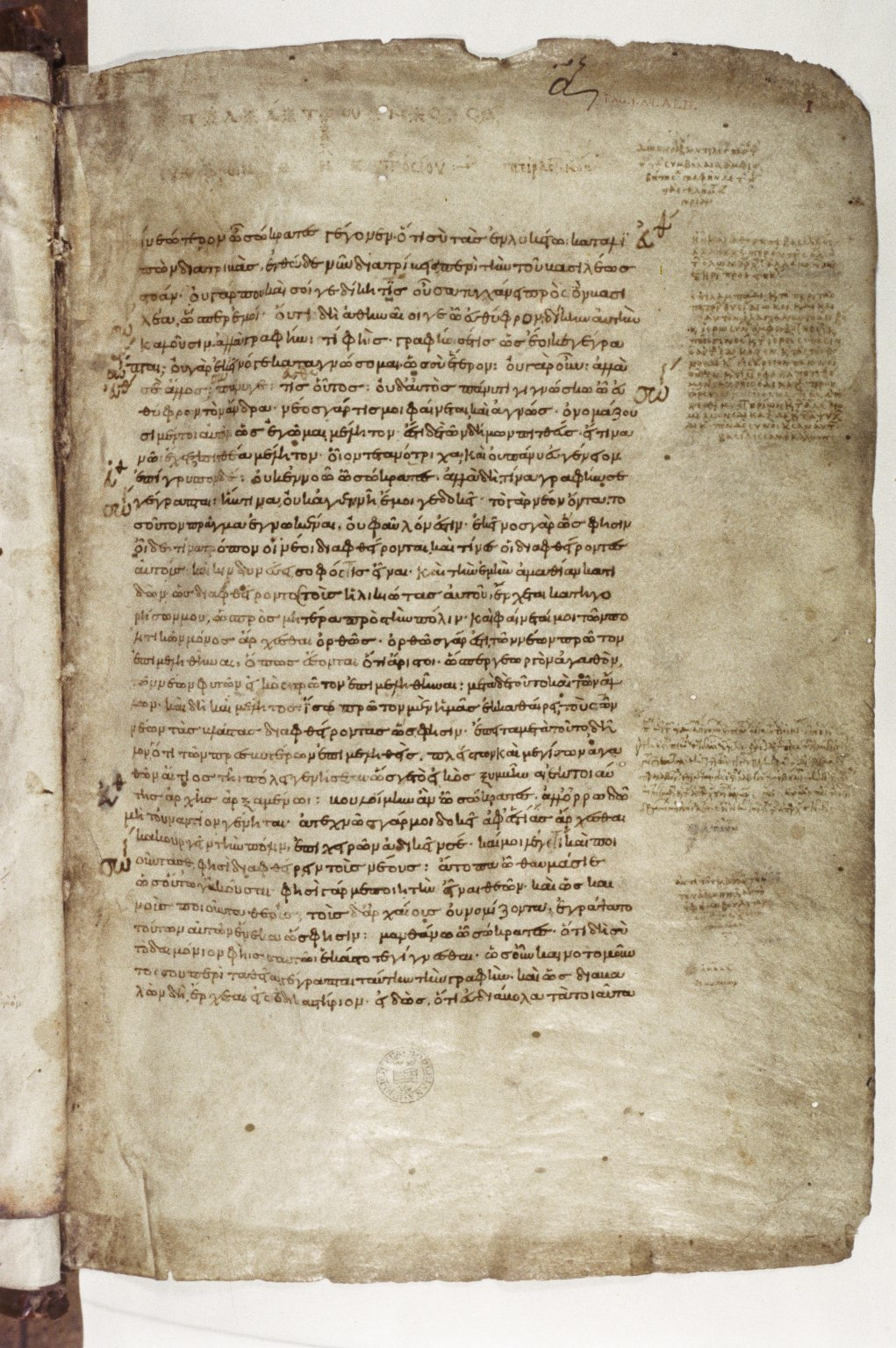
The Clarke Plato, 895 CE (Oxford, 1 recto)

Positing two fundamental principles raises the question of whether the unwritten doctrines and therefore—in the case they are authentic—of whether the whole of Plato's philosophy is monistic or dualistic. A philosophical system is monistic in the case when the opposition between the One and the Indefinite Dyad is founded upon a single, more fundamental principle. This occurs if the principle of multiplicity somehow reduces to the principle of unity and is subordinated to it. An alternative, monistic interpretation of the unwritten doctrines posits a higher 'meta-One' that serves as the foundation of both principles and unites them. If the Indefinite Dyad is, however, understood as an independent principle distinct from any sort of unity, then Plato's unwritten doctrines are in the end dualistic.

The evidence in the ancient sources does not make clear how the relation between the two principles should be understood. They do, however, consistently accord the One a higher status than the Indefinite Dyad and consider only the One as absolutely transcendent. This implies a monistic interpretation of the two principles and fits with assertions in the dialogues that suggest a monistic philosophy. Plato's Meno says that everything in nature is related, and the Republic states that there is an origin (archḗ) for all things, which can be grasped by reason.

The opinions of advocates of the Tübingen interpretation are divided on this question. Most favor resolving the dispute by concluding that, although Plato indeed considered the Indefinite Dyad as the indispensable and fundamental element of our ordered world, he nonetheless posited the One as some higher, overarching principle of unity. This would make Plato a monist. This position has been defended at length by Jens Halfwassen, Detlef Thiel, and Vittorio Hösle. Halfwassen asserts it is impossible to derive the Indefinite Dyad from the One since it would thereby lose its status as a fundamental principle. Moreover, an absolute and transcendental One could not contain any sort of latent multiplicity in itself. The Indefinite Dyad, however, would therefore not have an equal origin and equal power as the One, but is nonetheless dependent upon the One. According to Halfwassen's interpretation, therefore, Plato's philosophy is in the end monistic. John Niemeyer Findlay likewise makes the case for an emphatically monistic understanding of the two principles. Cornelia de Vogel also finds the monistic aspect of the system dominant. Two leading figures of the Tübingen School, Hans Joachim Krämer and Konrad Gaiser conclude that Plato has a single system with both monistic and dualistic aspects. Christina Schefer proposes that the opposition between the principles is logically irresolvable and points to something beyond them both. According to her, the opposition stems from some fundamental, 'ineffable' intuition that Plato experienced: namely, that the god Apollo is the common ground of both the One and the Indefinite Dyad. This theory also leads therefore to a monistic conception.

According to the prevailing view of researchers today, although the two principles are considered elements of a finally monistic system, they also have a dualistic aspect. This is not contested by defenders of the monistic interpretation but they assert the dualistic aspect is subordinated to a totality that is monistic. Its dualistic nature remains because not only the One but also the Indefinite Dyad is treated as a fundamental principle. Giovanni Reale emphasized the role of the Dyad as a fundamental origin. He thought, however, that the concept of dualism was inappropriate and spoke of a 'bipolar structure of reality.' For him, however, these two 'poles' were not equally significant: the One 'remains hierarchically superior to the Dyad.' Heinz Happ, Marie-Dominique Richard, and Paul Wilpert argued against every derivation of the Dyad from a superior principle of unity, and consequently contended that Plato's system was dualistic. They believe that Plato's originally dualistic system was later reinterpreted as a kind of monism.

If the two principles are authentically Plato's and the monistic interpretation is correct, then Plato's metaphysics strongly resembles the Neo-Platonic systems of the Roman Imperial period. In this case, the Neo-Platonic reading of Plato is, at least in this central area, historically justified. This implies that Neo-Platonism is less of an innovation than it appears without the recognition of Plato's unwritten doctrines. Advocates of the Tübingen School emphasize this advantage of their interpretation. They see Plotinus, the founder of Neo-Platonism, as advancing a tradition of thought begun by Plato himself. Plotinus's metaphysics, at least in broad outline, was therefore already familiar to the first generation of Plato's students. This confirms Plotinus' own view, for he considered himself not the inventor of a system but the faithful interpreter of Plato's doctrines.

=== The Good in the unwritten doctrines ===
An important research problem is the controversial question of the status of the Form of the Good within the metaphysical system derived from a combination of the Theory of Forms and the two principles of the reconstruction. The resolution of this issue depends upon how one interprets the status Plato gives to the Good in his Theory of Forms. Some believe that Plato's Republic sharply contrasts the Good and the usual Forms, and gives the Good a uniquely high rank. This accords with his conviction that all the other Forms owe their Being to the Form of the Good, and are thus ontologically subordinated to it.

The starting point of the scholarly controversy is the disputed meaning of the Greek concept of ousia. This is an ordinary Greek word and literally means 'being.' In philosophical contexts, it is usually translated by 'Being' or 'Essence.' Plato's Republic says that the Good is 'not ousia' but is rather 'beyond ousia' and surpasses it as an origin and in power. If this passage implies only that the essence or nature of the Good is beyond Being (but not the Good itself), or if the passage is just interpreted loosely, then the Form of the Good can retain its place inside the realm of the Forms, i.e., the realm of things with real Being. In this case the Good is not absolutely transcendent: it does not transcend Being and somehow exist above it. The Good would therefore have a place in the hierarchy of real Beings. According to this interpretation, the Good is not an issue for the two principles of the unwritten doctrines but only for the Theory of Forms. On the other hand, if the passage in the Republic is read literally and 'ousia' means 'Being,' then the phrase 'beyond Being' implies the Good actually transcends Being. According to this interpretation, Plato considered the Good to be absolutely transcendent and it must be integrated into the realm of the two principles.

If Plato considered the Good as transcendent, there is a problem about its relation to the One. Most proponents of the authenticity of the unwritten doctrines hold that the Good and the One were for Plato identical. According to their arguments, the identity follows from the nature of Absolute Transcendence, since it brooks no determinations of any kind and therefore also no distinction between the Good and the One as two separate principles. In addition, defenders of such an identity draw on evidence in Aristotle. A contrary view, however, is held by Rafael Ferber, who accepts that the unwritten doctrines are authentic and that they are concerned with the Good but denies that the Good and the One are identical.

=== Forms of numbers ===
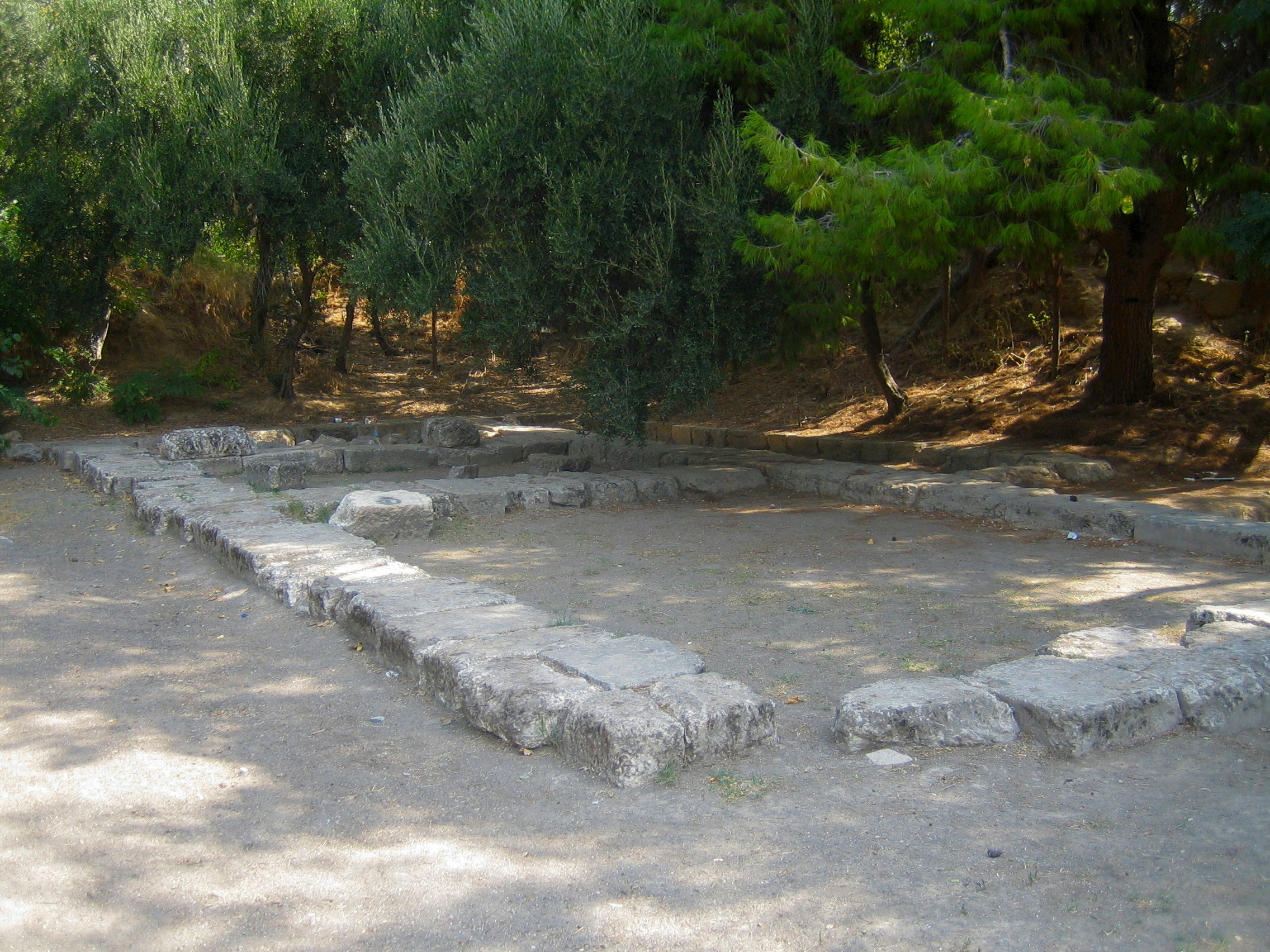
Excavations in Athens near the site of Plato's Academy, where the unwritten doctrines were supposedly debated

It can be inferred from the report of Aristoxenus about Plato's lecture 'On the Good,' that a discussion of the nature of numbers occupied an important part of Plato's argument. This theme accordingly played an important role in the unwritten doctrines. This involved, however, not mathematics but a philosophy of numbers. Plato distinguished between the numbers used in mathematics and the metaphysical Forms of numbers. In contrast to the numbers used in mathematics, the Forms of numbers do not consist of groups of units and so cannot be added together or subjected to the ordinary operations of arithmetic. The Form of Twoness, for example, does not consist of two units designated by the number 2 but rather the real essence of twoness.

According to defenders of the unwritten doctrines, Plato gave the Forms of Numbers a middle position between the two fundamental principles and the other, ordinary Forms. Indeed, these Forms of Numbers are the first entities to emerge from the One and the Indefinite Dyad. This emergence is—as with all metaphysical production—not to be understood as the result of a temporal process but rather as an ontological dependence. For example, the interaction of the One (the determining factor) and the Dyad (the source of multiplicity) leads to the Form of Twoness in the realm of the Forms of Numbers. As the product of both principles, the Form of Twoness reflects the nature of both: it is determinate twoness. Its fixed and determinate nature is shown by its expression of the relation between the Form of Doubleness (a determinate excess) and the Form of Halfness (a determinate deficiency). The Form of Twoness is not a group of units like the numbers used in mathematics but rather a connection between two magnitudes, one of which is double the other.

The One acts as the determining factor on the Indefinite Dyad, which is called 'the Great and the Small,' and eliminates its indeterminacy, which encompasses every possible relation between largeness and smallness or between excess and deficiency. Thus the One produces determinate relations between magnitudes by making the indeterminacy of the Indefinite Dyad determinate, and just these relations are understood by advocates of the unwritten doctrines to be the Forms of Numbers. This is the origin of determinate Twoness, which can from various perspectives be seen as the Form of Doubleness or the Form of Halfness. The other Forms of Numbers are derived in the same way out of the two fundamental principles. The structure of space is implicit in the Forms of Numbers: the dimensions of space somehow emerge from their relations. Key details of this extra-temporal emergence of space are missing from the surviving ancient testimonies, and its nature is debated in the scholarly literature.

=== Epistemological issues ===
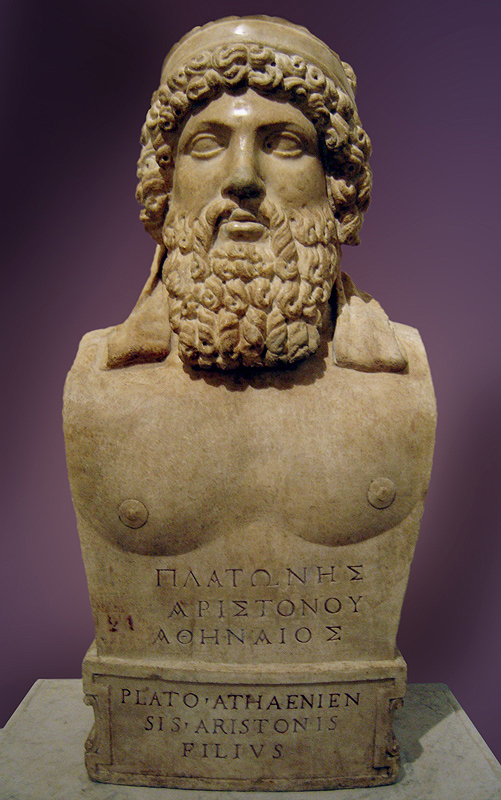
Herm of Plato. The Greek inscription reads 'Plato [son] of Ariston, Athenian' (Rome, Capitoline Museum, 288).

Plato believed that only experts in 'dialectics,' i.e., philosophers who follow his logical methods, are competent to make statements about the highest principle. Thus he would have developed the theory of the two principles—if indeed it is his—discursively in discussions and grounded it in argument. From these discussions, it emerged that a highest principle is necessary for his system, and that the One must be inferred indirectly from its effects. Whether and to what degree Plato in addition held it possible to have direct access to the sphere of the absolute and transcendental One or indeed ever claimed such a thing is debated in the literature. This poses the question of whether the assertion of transcendental Being also entails the possibility of knowledge of that higher Being, or whether the highest principle is known theoretically but not in any more direct way.

If human understanding were restricted to discursive or verbal arguments, then Plato's dialectical discussions could at most have reached the conclusion that the highest principle was demanded by his metaphysics but also that human understanding could never arrive at that transcendental Being. If so, the only remaining way that the One might be reached (and the Good, if that is the same as the One) is through the possibility of some nonverbal, 'intuitive' access. It is debated whether or not Plato in fact took this route. If he did, he thereby renounced the possibility of justifying every step made by our knowledge with philosophical arguments that can be expressed discursively in words.

At least in regards to the One, Michael Erler concludes from a statement in the Republic that Plato held it was only intuitively knowable. In contrast, Peter Stemmer, Kurt von Fritz, Jürgen Villers, and others oppose any independent role for non-verbal intuition. Jens Halfwassen believes that knowledge of the realm of the Forms rests centrally upon direct intuition, which he understands as unmediated comprehension by some non-sensory, 'inner perception' (Ger., Anschauung). He also, however, holds that Plato's highest principle transcended knowledge and was thus inaccessible to such intuition. For Plato, the One would therefore make knowledge possible and give it the power of knowing things, but would itself remain unknowable and ineffable.

Christina Schefer argues that both Plato's written and unwritten doctrines deny any and every kind of philosophical access to transcendental Being. Plato nonetheless found such access along a different path: in an ineffable, religious experience of the appearance or theophany of the god Apollo. In the center of Plato's worldview, she argues, stood neither the Theory of Forms nor the principles of the unwritten doctrines but rather the experience of Apollo, which since it was non-verbal could not have grounded any verbal doctrines. The Tübingen interpretation of Plato's principles, she continues, correctly makes them an important component of Plato's philosophy, but they lead to insoluble puzzles and paradoxes (Gk., aporiai) and therefore are ultimately a dead end. It should be inferred from Plato's statements that he nonetheless found a way out, a way that leads beyond the Theory of Forms. In this interpretation, even the principles of the unwritten doctrines are to a degree merely provisional means to an end.

The scholarly literature is broadly divided on the question of whether or not Plato regarded the principles of the unwritten doctrines as certainly true. The Tübingen School attributes an epistemological optimism to Plato. This is especially emphasized by Hans Krämer. His view is that Plato himself asserted the highest possible claim to certainty for knowledge of the truth of his unwritten doctrines. He calls Plato, at least in regard to his two principles, a 'dogmatist.' Other scholars and especially Rafael Ferber uphold the opposing view that for Plato the unwritten doctrines were advanced only as a hypothesis that could be wrong. Konrad Gaiser argues that Plato formulated the unwritten doctrines as a coherent and complete philosophical system but not as a 'Summa of fixed dogmas preached in a doctrinaire way and announced as authoritative.' Instead, he continues, they were something for critical examination that could be improved: a model proposed for continuous, further development.

For Plato it is essential to bind epistemology together with ethics. He emphasizes that a student's access to insights communicated orally is possible only to those souls whose character fulfills the necessary prerequisites. The philosopher who engages in oral instruction must always ascertain whether the student has the needed character and disposition. According to Plato, knowledge is not won simply by grasping things with the intellect; instead, it is achieved as the fruit of prolonged efforts made by the entire soul. There must be an inner affinity between what is communicated and the soul receiving the communication.

== The question of dating and historical development ==
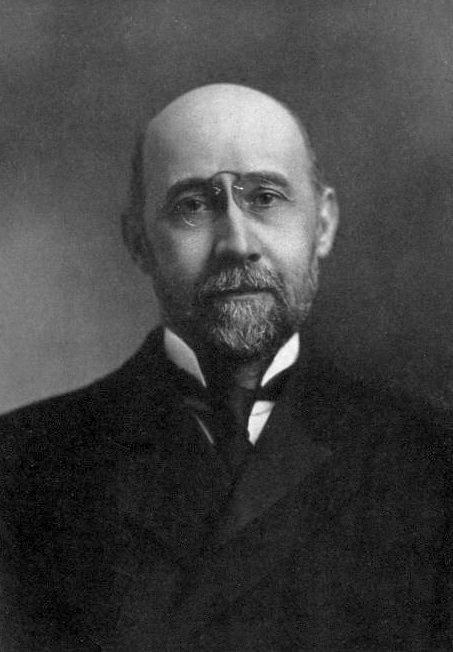
Professor Paul Shorey, here at the University of Chicago c. 1909, was a prominent advocate for unitarianism in Plato studies and Harold Cherniss's teacher.

It is debated when Plato held his public lecture 'On the Good.' For the advocates of the Tübingen interpretation this is connected with the question of whether the unwritten doctrines belong to Plato's later philosophy or were worked out relatively early in his career. Resolving this question depends in turn upon the long-standing debate in Plato studies between 'unitarians' and 'developmentalists.' The unitarians maintain that Plato always defended a single, coherent metaphysical system throughout his career; developmentalists distinguish several different phases in Plato's thought and hold that he was forced by problems he encountered while writing the dialogues to revise his system in significant ways.

In the older literature, the prevailing view was that Plato's lecture took place at the end of Plato's life. The origin of his unwritten doctrines was therefore assigned to the final phase of his philosophical activity. In more recent literature, an increasing number of researchers favor dating the unwritten doctrines to an earlier period. This clashes with the suppositions of the unitarians. Whether or not Plato's early dialogues allude to the unwritten dialogues is contested.

The older view that Plato's public lecture occurred late in Plato's career has been energetically denied by Hans Krämer. He argues that the lecture was held in the early period of Plato's activity as a teacher. Moreover, he says, the lecture was not given in public only once. It is more probable, he says, that there was a series of lectures and only the first introductory lecture was, as an experiment, open to a broad and unprepared audience. After the failure of this public debut, Plato drew the conclusion that his doctrines should only be shared with philosophy students. The lecture on the Good and the ensuing discussions formed part of an ongoing series of talks, in which Plato regularly over the period of several decades made his students familiar with the unwritten doctrines. He was holding these sessions already by the time of this first trip to Sicily (c. 389/388) and thus before he founded the Academy.

Those historians of philosophy who date the lecture to a later time have proposed several different possible periods: between 359/355 (Karl-Heinz Ilting), between 360/358 (Hermann Schmitz), around 352 (Detlef Thiel), and the time between the death of Dion(354) and Plato's own death (348/347: Konrad Gaiser). Gaiser emphasizes that the late date of the lecture does not entail that the unwritten doctrines were a late development. He rather finds that these doctrines were from early on a part of the Academy's curriculum, probably as early as the founding of the school.

It is unclear why Plato presented such demanding material as the unwritten doctrines to a public not yet educated in philosophy and was thereby met—as could not be otherwise—with incomprehension. Gaiser supposes that he opened the lectures to the public in order to confront distorted reports of the unwritten doctrines and thereby to deflate the circulating rumors that the Academy was a hive of subversive activity.

== Reception ==
=== Influence before the early modern period ===
Among the first generations of Plato's students, there was a living memory of Plato's oral teaching, which was written up by many of them and influenced the literature of the period (much of which no longer survives today). The unwritten doctrines were vigorously criticized by Aristotle, who examined them in two treatises named 'On the Good' and 'On Philosophy' (of which we have only a few fragments) and in other works such as his Metaphysics and Physics. Aristotle's student Theophrastus also discussed them in his Metaphysics.

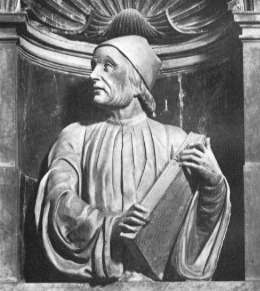
Bust of Marsilio Ficino in the cathedral in Florence (by A. Ferrucci, 1521). He seems to play his translation of Plato like a lyre.

In the following Hellenistic Period (323–31 BCE) when the Academy's doctrine shifted to Academic Skepticism, the inheritance of Plato's unwritten doctrines could attract little interest (if they were known at all). Philosophical skepticism faded by the time of Middle Platonism, but the philosophers of this period seem no better informed about the unwritten doctrines than modern scholars.

After the rediscovery in the Renaissance of the original text of Plato's dialogues (which had been lost in the Middle Ages), the early modern period was dominated by an image of Plato's metaphysics influenced by a combination of Neo-Platonism and Aristotle's reports of the basics of the unwritten doctrines. The Humanist Marsilio Ficino (1433–1499) and his Neo-Platonic interpretation decisively contributed to the prevailing view with his translations and commentaries. Later, the influential popularizer, writer, and Plato translator Thomas Taylor (1758–1835) reinforced this Neo-Platonic tradition of Plato interpretation. The Eighteenth century increasingly saw the Neo-Platonic paradigm as problematic but was unable to replace it with a consistent alternative. The unwritten doctrines were still accepted in this period. The German philosopher Wilhelm Gottlieb Tennemann proposed in his 1792–95 System of Plato's Philosophy that Plato had never intended that his philosophy should be entirely represented in written form.

=== Nineteenth century ===
In the nineteenth century a scholarly debate began that continues to this day over the question of whether unwritten doctrines must be considered and over whether they constitute a philosophical inheritance that adds something new to the dialogues.

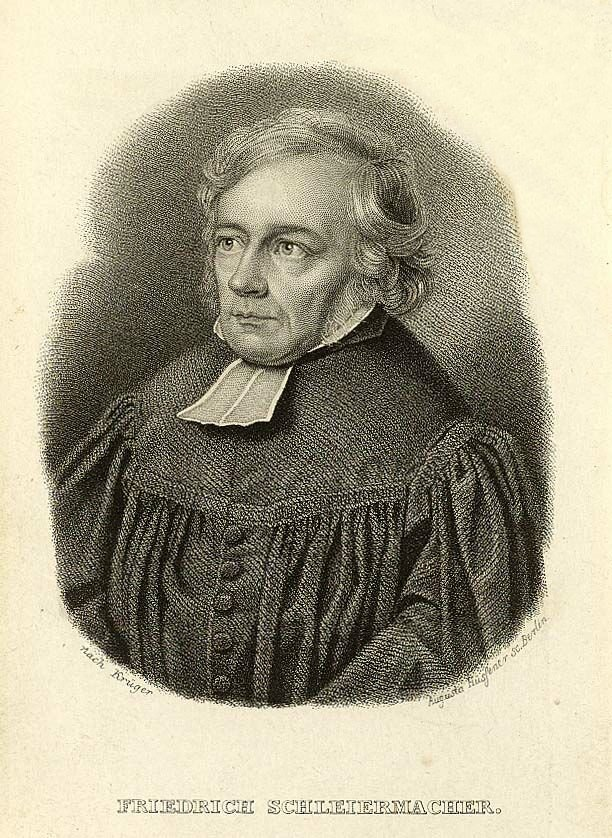
Friedrich Schleiermacher

The Neo-Platonic interpretation of Plato prevailed until the beginning the nineteenth century when in 1804 Friedrich Schleiermacher published an introduction to his 1804 translation of Plato's dialogues and initiated a radical turn whose consequences are still felt today. Schleiermacher was convinced that the entire content of Plato's philosophy was contained in his dialogues. There never was, he insisted, any oral teaching that went beyond them. According to his conception, the genre of the dialogue is no literary replacement for Plato's philosophy, rather the literary form of the dialogue and the content of Plato's philosophy are inseparably bound together: Plato's way of philosophizing can by its nature only be represented as a literary dialogue. Therefore, unwritten doctrines with any philosophically relevant, special content that are not bound together into a literary dialogue must be excluded.

Schleiermacher's conception was rapidly and widely accepted and became the standard view. Its many advocates include Eduard Zeller, a leading historian of philosophy in the nineteenth century, whose influential handbook The Philosophy of the Greeks and its Historical Development militated against 'supposed secret doctrines' and had lasting effects on the reception of Plato's works.

Schleiermacher's stark denial of any oral teaching was disputed from the beginning but his critics remained isolated. In 1808, August Boeckh, who later became a well-known Greek scholar, stated in an edition of Schleiermacher's Plato translations that he did not find the arguments against the unwritten doctrines persuasive. There was a great probability, he said, that Plato had an esoteric teaching never overtly expressed but only darkly hinted at: 'what he here [in the dialogues] did not carry out to the final point, he there in oral instruction placed the topmost capstone on.' Christian August Brandis collected and commented upon the ancient sources for the unwritten doctrines. Friedrich Adolf Trendelenburg and Christian Hermann Weisse stressed the significance of the unwritten doctrines in their investigations. Even Karl Friedrich Hermann, in an 1849 inquiry into Plato's literary motivations, turned against Schleiermacher's theses and proposed that Plato had only insinuated the deeper core of his philosophy in his writings and directly communicated it only orally.

=== Before the Tübingen School: Harold Cherniss ===
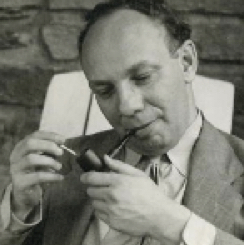
Harold Cherniss, critic of the unwritten doctrines, in 1941-2

Until the second half of the twentieth century, the 'antiesoteric' approach in Plato studies was clearly dominant. However, some researchers before the midpoint of the century did assert Plato had an oral teaching. These included John Burnet, Julius Stenzel, Alfred Edward Taylor, Léon Robin, Paul Wilpert, and Heinrich Gomperz. Since 1959, the fully worked out interpretation of the Tübingen School has carried on an intense rivalry with the anti-esoteric approach.

In the twentieth century, the most prolific defender of the anti-esoteric approach was Harold Cherniss. He expounded his views already in 1942, that is, before the investigations and publications of the Tübingen School. His main concern was to undermine the credibility of Aristotle's evidence for the unwritten doctrines, which he attributed to Aristotle's dismissive hostility towards Plato's theories as well as certain misunderstandings. Cherniss believed that Aristotle, in the course of his polemics, had falsified Plato's views and that Aristotle had even contradicted himself. Cherniss flatly denied that any oral teaching of Plato had extra content over and above the dialogues. Modern hypotheses about philosophical instruction in the Academy were, he said, groundless speculation. There was, moreover, a fundamental contradiction between the Theory of Forms found in the dialogues and Aristotle's reports. Cherniss insisted that Plato had consistently championed the Theory of Forms and that there was no plausible argument for the assumption that he modified it according to the supposed principles of the unwritten doctrines. The Seventh Letter was irrelevant since it was, Cherniss held, inauthentic.

=== The anti-systematic interpretation of Plato's philosophy ===
In the late twentieth and early twenty-first centuries, a radicalization of Schleiermacher's dialogical approach arose. Numerous scholars urged an 'anti-systematic' interpretation of Plato that is also known as 'dialogue theory.' This approach condemns every kind of 'dogmatic' Plato interpretation and especially the possibility of esoteric, unwritten doctrines. It is fundamentally opposed to the proposition that Plato possessed a definite, systematic teaching and asserted its truth. The proponents of this anti-systematic approach at least agree that the essence of Plato's way of doing philosophy is not the establishment of individual doctrines but rather shared, 'dialogical' reflection and in particular the testing of various methods of inquiry. This style of philosophy—as Schleiermacher already had stressed—is characterized by a process of investigation (rather than its results) that aims to stimulate further and deeper thoughts in his readers. It does not seek to fix the truth of final dogmas, but encourages a never-ending series of questions and answers. This far-reaching development of Schleiermacher's theory of the dialogue at last even turned against him: he was roundly criticized for wrongly seeking a systematic philosophy in the dialogues.

The advocates of this anti-systematic interpretation do not see a contradiction between Plato's criticism of writing and the notion that he communicated his entire philosophy to the public in writing. They believe his criticism was aimed only at the kind of writing that expresses dogmas and doctrines. Since the dialogues are not like this but instead present their material in the guise of fictional conversations, Plato's criticism does not apply.

=== The origin and dissemination of the Tübingen paradigm ===
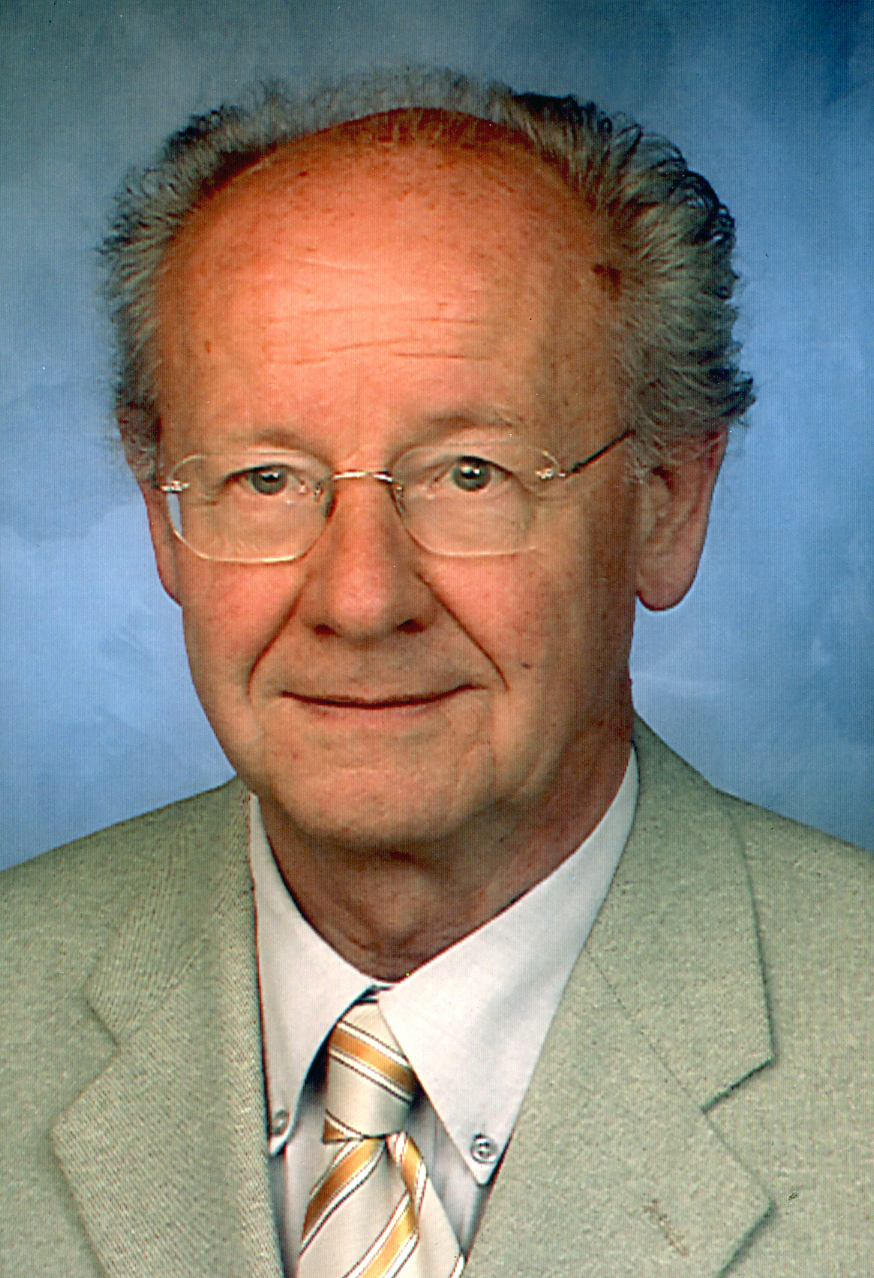
Thomas A. Szlezák, a prominent advocate of the Tübingen approach

Until the 1950s, the question of whether one could in fact infer the existence of unwritten doctrines from the ancient sources stood at the center of the discussion. After the Tübingen School introduced its new paradigm, a vigorous controversy arose and debate shifted to the new question of whether the Tübingen Hypothesis was correct: that the unwritten doctrines could actually be reconstructed and contained the core of Plato's philosophy.

The Tübingen paradigm was formulated and thoroughly defended for the first time by Hans Joachim Krämer. He published the results of his research in a 1959 monograph that was a revised version of a 1957 dissertation written under the supervision of Wolfgang Schadewaldt. In 1963, Konrad Gaiser, who was also a student of Schadewaldt, qualified as a professor with his comprehensive monograph on the unwritten doctrines. In the following decades both these scholars expanded on and defended the new paradigm in a series of publications while teaching at Tübingen University.

Further well-known proponents of the Tübingen paradigm include Thomas Alexander Szlezák, who also taught at Tübingen from 1990 to 2006 and worked especially on Plato's criticism of writing, the historian of philosophy Jens Halfwassen, who taught at Heidelberg and especially investigated the history of Plato's two principles from the fourth century BCE through Neo-Platonism, and Vittorio Hösle, who teaches at the University of Notre Dame (USA).

Supporters of the Tübinger approach to Plato include, for example, Michael Erler, Jürgen Wippern, Karl Albert, Heinz Happ, Willy Theiler, Klaus Oehler, Hermann Steinthal, John Niemeyer Findlay, Marie-Dominique Richard, Herwig Görgemanns, Walter Eder, Josef Seifert, Joachim Söder, Carl Friedrich von Weizsäcker, Detlef Thiel, and—with a new and far-reaching theory—Christina Schefer.

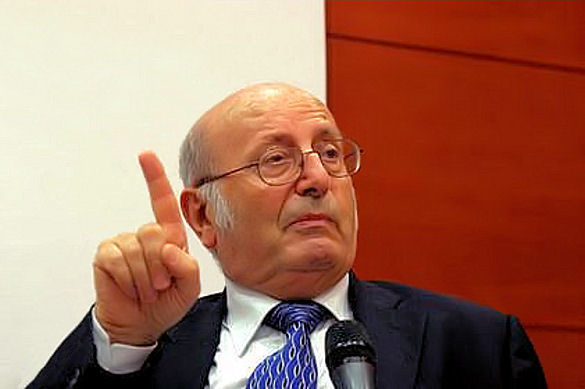
Giovanni Reale was the leading advocate for the unwritten doctrines in Italy.

Those who partially agree with the Tübingen approach but have reservations include Cornelia J. de Vogel, Rafael Ferber, John M. Dillon, Jürgen Villers, Christopher Gill, Enrico Berti, and Hans-Georg Gadamer.

Since the important research of Giovanni Reale, an Italian historian of philosophy who extended the Tübingen paradigm in new directions, it is today also called the 'Tübingen and Milanese School.' In Italy, Maurizio Migliori and Giancarlo Movia have also spoken out for the authenticity of the unwritten doctrines. Recently, Patrizia Bonagura, a student of Reale, has strongly defended the Tübingen approach.

=== Critics of the Tübingen School ===
Various, skeptical positions have found support, especially in Anglo-American scholarship but also among German-speaking scholars. These critics include: in the USA, Gregory Vlastos, and Reginald E. Allen; in Italy, Franco Trabattoni, and Francesco Fronterotta; in France, Luc Brisson; and in Sweden, E. N. Tigerstedt. German-speaking critics include: Theodor Ebert, Ernst Heitsch, Fritz-Peter Hager, and Günther Patzig.

The radical, skeptical position holds that Plato did not teach anything orally that was not already in the dialogues.

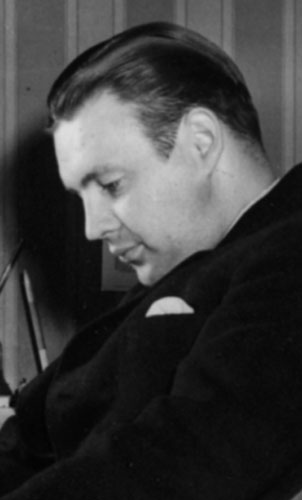
E. N. Tigerstedt, a historian of the fall of Neo-Platonism in the Early Modern Period, criticized the Tübingen interpretation.

Moderate skeptics accept that there were some kind of unwritten doctrines but criticize the Tübingen reconstruction as speculative, insufficiently grounded in evidence, and too far-reaching. Many critics of the Tübingen School do not dispute the authenticity of the principles ascribed to Plato, but see them as a late notion of Plato's that was never worked out systematically and so was not integrated with the philosophy he developed beforehand. They maintain that the two principles theory was not the core of Plato's philosophy but rather a tentative concept discussed in the last phase of his philosophical activity. He introduced these concepts as a hypothesis but did not integrate them with the metaphysics that underlies the dialogues.

Proponents of this moderate view include Dorothea Frede, Karl-Heinz Ilting, and Holger Thesleff. Similarly, Andreas Graeser judges the unwritten principles to be a 'contribution to a discussion with student interns' while Jürgen Mittelstraß takes them to be 'a cautious question to which a hypothetical response is suggested.' Rafael Ferber believes that Plato never committed the principles to a fixed, written form because, among other things, he did not regard them as knowledge but as mere opinion. Margherita Isnardi Parente does not dispute the possibility of unwritten doctrines but judges the tradition of reports about them to be unreliable holding it impossible to unite the Tübingen reconstruction with the philosophy of the dialogues, in which the authentic views of Plato are to be found. The reports of Aristotle do not derive from Plato himself but rather from efforts aimed at systematizing his thought by members of the early Academy. Franco Ferrari also denies that this systematization should be ascribed to Plato. Wolfgang Kullmann accepts the authenticity of the two principles but sees a fundamental contradiction between them and the philosophy of the dialogues. Wolfgang Wieland accepts the reconstruction of the unwritten dialogues but rates its philosophical relevance very low and thinks it cannot be the core of Plato's philosophy. Franz von Kutschera maintains that the existence of the unwritten doctrines cannot be seriously questioned but finds that the tradition of reports about them are of such low quality that any attempts at reconstruction must rely on the dialogues. Domenico Pesce affirms the existence of unwritten doctrines and that they concerned the Good but condemns the Tübingen reconstruction and in particular the claim that Plato's metaphysics was bipolar.

There is a striking secondary aspect apparent in the sometimes sharp and vigorous controversies over the Tübingen School: the antagonists on both sides have tended to argue from within a presupposed worldview. Konrad Gaiser remarked about this aspect of the debate: 'In this controversy, and probably on both sides, certain modern conceptions of what philosophy should be play an unconscious role and for this reason there is little hope of a resolution.'

== See also ==
- Allegorical interpretations of Plato, a survey of various claims to find doctrines represented by allegories within Plato's dialogues
- Harold Cherniss, American champion of Platonic unitarianism and critic of esotericism
- Hans Krämer, a founder of the Tübingen School (in German)
- Konrad Gaiser, a founder of the Tübingen School (in German)
- Oral Torah, a concept in Rabbinic Judaism; statutes and legal interpretations that were not recorded in the Written Torah.

== Sources ==
=== English language resources ===
- Dmitri Nikulin, ed., The Other Plato: The Tübingen Interpretation of Plato's Inner-Academic Teachings (Albany: SUNY, 2012). A recent anthology with an introduction and overview.
- Hans Joachim Krämer and John R. Catan, Plato and the Foundations of Metaphysics: A Work on the Theory of the Principles and Unwritten Doctrines of Plato with a Collection of the Fundamental Documents (SUNY Press, 1990). Translation of work by a founder of the Tübingen School.
- John Dillon, The Heirs of Plato: A Study of the Old Academy, 347 – 274 BCE (Oxford: Clarendon Press, 2003), esp. pp. 16 – 29. A moderate view of the unwritten doctrines by a leading scholar.
- Harold Cherniss, The Riddle of the Early Academy (Berkeley: University of California Press, 1945). Prominent American critic of the unwritten doctrines.
- Gregory Vlastos, review of H. J. Kraemer, Arete bei Platon und Aristoteles, in Gnomon, v. 35, 1963, pp. 641–655. Reprinted with a further appendix in: Platonic Studies (Princeton: Princeton University Press, 1981, 2nd ed.), pp. 379–403. Famous critical review that, along with Cherniss’s Riddle, turned many Anglo-American scholars against the Tübingen School.
- John Niemeyer Findlay, Plato: The Written and Unwritten Doctrines (London: Routledge, 2013). An older work, first published in 1974, advocating for the importance of the unwritten doctrines independently of the Tübingen School.
- K. Sayre, Plato's Late Ontology: A Riddle Resolved (Princeton: Princeton University Press, 1983) and Metaphysics and Method in Plato's Statesman (Cambridge: Cambridge University Press, 2011). Sayre seeks a middle position by arguing that allusions to the unwritten doctrines can be found in the dialogues.

=== Collections of the ancient evidence ===
- Margherita Isnardi Parente (ed.): Testimonia Platonica (= Atti della Accademia Nazionale dei Lincei, Classe di scienze morali, storiche e filologiche, Memorie, Reihe 9, Band 8 Heft 4 und Band 10 Heft 1). Rom 1997–1998 (a critical edition with Italian translation and commentary)
  - Heft 1: Le testimonianze di Aristotele, 1997
  - Heft 2: Testimonianze di età ellenistica e di età imperiale, 1998
- Giovanni Reale (ed.): Autotestimonianze e rimandi dei dialoghi di Platone alle "dottrine non scritte". Bompiani, Milano 2008, ISBN 978-88-452-6027-8 (A collection of relevant texts with Italian translation and a substantial introduction, in which Reale responds to critics of his position.)
