= Wilhelm von Christ =

German classical scholar (1831–1906)

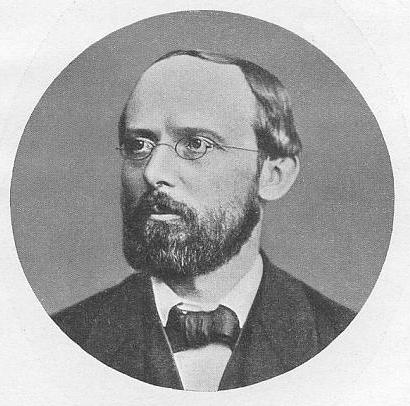
Wilhelm von Christ

Wilhelm von Christ (2 August 1831 – 8 February 1906) was a German classical scholar.

== Biography ==
The son of a baker and a miller's daughter, Christ was born in Geisenheim in Hesse-Nassau. He attended the Gymnasium in Hadamar and studied at the Ludwig-Maximilians-Universität München from 1850 under Karl Halm, Friedrich Thiersch, Karl von Prantl, and Leonhard Spengel, then at the Friedrich Wilhelm University of Berlin under Friedrich Adolf Trendelenburg, August Boeckh und Franz Bopp. In 1853, he received his doctorate at Berlin for a work on Aristotle and the next year he became a teacher at the Maximiliansgymnasium in Munich. In 1860, Christ was appointed extraordinary professor of Classical philology at the Ludwig-Maximilians-Universität München; he became an ordinary professor in 1863. From 1891 until 1892, he was rector of the university. He maintained a connection to secondary education as a member of the senior school council of Bavaria in 1872 and of the Imperial School Commission in 1890.

Christ was an extraordinary member of the Bavarian Academy of Sciences and Humanities from 1858 and an ordinary member from 1864. He published numerous articles in the Academy's publications. From 1870, he was an honorary member of the Greek philological society in Constantinople. After receiving the Order of Merit of the Bavarian Crown in 1876, he was raised to the nobility as Ritter von Christ. In 1893, he was named as an ordinary member of the German Archaeological Institute. In 1894, he was admitted to the Bavarian Maximilian Order for Science and Art.

In 1886, Wilhelm Christ was the first to put forward the theory that the Sea Peoples were identical with Plato's Atlanteans. Later, this thesis was repeated with variations by scholars and researchers such as Theodor Gomperz, Spyridon Marinatos, Jürgen Spanuth, John V. Luce, and Herwig Görgemanns.

== Selected works ==
- Studia in Aristotelis libros metaphysicos collata. Diss. Berlin 1853.
- Grundzüge der griechischen Lautlehre. Teubner, Leipzig 1859.
- Von der Bedeutung der Sanskritstudien für die griechische Philologie. Weiß, Munich 1860.
- Metrik der Griechen und Römer. Teubner, Leipzig 1874; 2. Auflage 1879. Nachdruck: Gerstenberg, Hildesheim 1972.
- (with Franz Joseph Lauth): Führer durch das K. Antiquarium in München. Franz, Munich 1870 (several revised editions).
- Geschichte der griechischen Litteratur bis auf die Zeit Justinians. Beck, Munich 1889; 4. Auflage 1905.
- Reform des Universitätsunterrichtes. Wolf, Munich 1891 (Rektoratsantrittsrede).

Editions

- Pindar: Carmina. Teubner, Leipzig 1869. Numerous revised editions.
- (mit Matthaios K. Paranikas): Anthologia Graeca carminum Christianorum. Teubner, Leipzig 1871. Nachdruck Olms, Hildesheim 1963.
- Aristoteles: Ars poetica. Teubner, Leipzig 1878. Numerous revised editions/reprintings.
- Homer: Ilias. Teubner, Leipzig 1884.
- Aristoteles: Metaphysik. Teubner, Leipzig 1886. Numerous revised editions/reprintings.
