= Hosle (disambiguation) =

Hösle, Hoesle or Hosle may refer to:

- Vittorio Hösle, German philosopher
- Robert Hoesle, partner of Behnisch Architekten
- Hosle, district in the municipality of Bærum, Norway
- Hosle IL, sports club
