= Philosophical communication =

Philosophical communication, or the way of communicating philosophical thought, is a specific aspect of communication, that is, the typically human activity through which contents are made available, shared, and generated between two or more people.

== The problem in ancient philosophers ==
Among the first thinkers in history, there were authors who wrote their works in the form of verse poems; later, philosophy was predominantly written in prose, thus emphasizing the distinction – later theorized by Plato – between poetry, as a plausible imitation of reality, and philosophy, which tends towards formalization and the expression of truth or the Idea. In this way, however, philosophy renounced the artistic form that made its reading more attractive.

In Greek antiquity, the preferred way to express any type of knowledge was the spontaneous use of oral communication. When written transmission appears, it takes on the function of synthetically fixing and making memorable new content of knowledge. Until the 5th century, when the sophists, masters of the techné (technique) of rhetoric, appear, poetic expression was certainly superior to prose, which was more suitable for expressing abstract thoughts. However, even later, as in the Hellenistic and Late Roman Empire ages, the use of verse is not entirely abandoned, as evidenced by the Stoic Cleanthes in the Hymn to Zeus.

Another widely used genre in philosophical communication of the ancient period was the epistle, generally addressed to an acquaintance or friend of the writer, and therefore often initially of a private nature. However, the ancients were reluctant to publish letters concerning their private and intimate sphere, and thus the epistle gradually assumed the value of bringing one's philosophical considerations to external readers.

In Aristotle's school, this literary genre was used for philosophical and scientific writings. Initially, the epistle was a response to a specific recipient who had raised doubts and objections to the official doctrine; subsequently, it became a true form of communication to the public, in the form of fictitious recipients, of philosophical problems. An example of this latter type of philosophical communication is Epicurus' "Letter to Menoeceus"

== Plato's solution ==
Plato in Letter VII seems to support positions similar to those of his master Socrates on the limits of writing, but he even seems to anticipate certain interpretations of the value of existential communication in Kierkegaard when he says that he will hide his intimate convictions about "the things he gives thought to" because they are difficult to understand except in an existential dialogic contact rather than in writing. "This, however, I can say about all those who have written or will write claiming to know the things I give thought to, whether having heard them from me or from others, or having discovered them themselves: in my opinion, it is not possible that they have understood anything of this subject. There is no writing of mine about these things, nor will there ever be [...] For this reason, no one who has sense will dare to entrust their thoughts to such a means of expression, to a motionless medium, as indeed are the words fixed in the characters of writing"

Plato's solution was to maintain prose expression in philosophical discourse but at the same time recover the artistic aspect by introducing the dialogic literary form and especially the use of myth. Plato will try to recover poetic wisdom within philosophy, while for Aristotle, breaking all ties with poetry, philosophy will be exclusively rational and specialized.

The prevailing problem from Socrates onwards was not so much whether to give philosophical thought an artistic form or not, but whether communication should take place orally or in writing.

Plato was actually in disagreement with his master Socrates, who had never wanted to present his thoughts in writing because for him the written word is like "a bronze that when struck always gives the same sound". In other words, writing did not respond to the interlocutor's questions, and this nullified the value of the philosophical dialogue where the two interlocutors seek truth together, with mutual questions and answers. A truth that, moreover, must always be questioned, and this is only possible with dialogue, in oral form, since what is written does not change.

Thus, two needs are opposed: that of Socrates, who aspires to an open and continuously evolving philosophizing that leads to the conviction of the interlocutor, but which remains imprecise in colloquial language and in its poorly defined terms, and that of Plato, who adopts a closed system of doing philosophy that does not allow immediate replies since what is stated has been long meditated and fixed in the certainty of the written word, and especially because immutable truths that come from the "world of ideas" are communicated. Plato's way of philosophizing is more accurate but, in a sense, static. It is no coincidence that in Platonic production, the Socratic dialogic form of his writings, present in his early works, is gradually abandoned in maturity: the figure of Socrates loses more and more relevance, and the dialogue is reduced to being a monologue, a dialogue, as it has been said, of the soul with itself.

== Bibliography ==
- Louis Trolle Hjelmslev, "Prolegomena to a Theory of Language". Edited by Giulio C. Lepschy. Turin, 1975
- Martin Buber, "I and Thou", trans. Bianquis, Paris 1938, pp. 20 – 21
- Gabriele Giannantoni [ed.], "The Presocratics, Testimonies and fragments", Rome-Bari 1993
- Margherita Isnardi Parente,"Works of Epicurus", Turin 1974
- C. Mazzarelli in "Plato, Complete Works" edited by Giovanni Reale, Milan 1991
- Emmanuel Mounier, "Personalism", Paris 1949
- Karl Jaspers, "Introduction to Philosophy", Zurich 1950
- Karl Jaspers, "Philosophy", II, Berlin 1932, Italian trans. in the vol. "My Philosophy", Turin 1946
- Nikolai Alexandrovich Berdyaev, "Five Meditations on Existence" Paris 1936, Italian trans. "The Self and the World", Milan 1942
- Ludwig Feuerbach, "Principles of the Philosophy of the Future": Italian trans. Turin 1946
- Maurice Merleau-Ponty, "Phenomenology of Perception", Paris 1945;
- Maurice Merleau-Ponty, "Humanism and Terror", Paris 1947
- Jolivet, "Journal of Metaphysics", Paris 1950
- Louis Lavelle, "Speech and Writing", Paris 1942
- F. C. Manara, Notes on philosophical communication, in Research community and initiation to philosophizing, Milan, Lampi di Stampa, 2004, pp. 125–155.
