= Herwig =

Herwig is both a masculine German given name and a surname. Notable people with the name include:

Given name:

- Herwig Ahrendsen (born 1948), German handball player
- Herwig Dirnböck (born 1935), Austrian sprint canoeist
- Herwig Drechsel (born 1973), Austrian footballer
- Herwig Görgemanns (born 1931), German classical scholar
- Herwig Kircher (born 1955), Austrian footballer
- Herwig Kogelnik (born 1932), Austrian electrical engineer
- Herwig Mitteregger (born 1953), Austrian musician
- Herwig Reiter (born 1941), Austrian composer
- Herwig Schopper (1924–2025), German physicist
- Herwig van Staa (born 1942), Austrian politician
- Herwig Wolfram (born 1934), Austrian historian

Surname:

- Bob Herwig (1914–1974), American football player
- Conrad Herwig (born 1959), American jazz trombonist
- Holger Herwig (born 1941), German-Canadian historian
- Malte Herwig (born 1972), German writer, journalist and literary critic
- Walther Herwig (1838–1912), German jurist, biologist and politician
- Christopher Herwig (born 1974), German-Canadian photographer and filmmaker
