= Giovanni Reale =

Italian historian of philosophy (1931–2014)

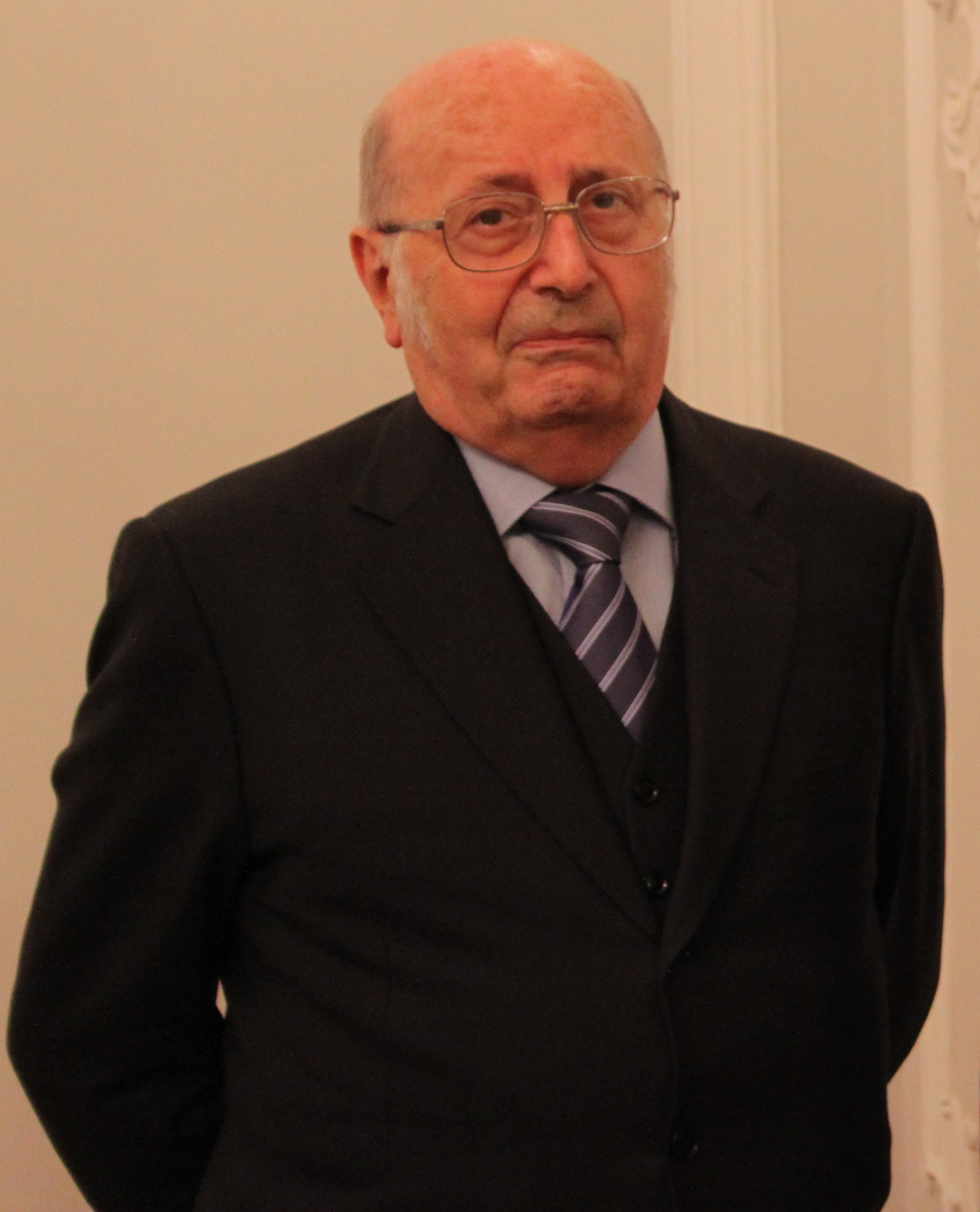
- Giovanni Reale in 2013
- Born: April 15, 1931; Candia Lomellina, province of Pavia, Lombardy, Italy
- Died: October 15, 2014 (aged 83); Luino, province of Varese, Lombardy, Italy

Education
- Education: Università Cattolica del Sacro Cuore

Philosophical work
- Main interests: Plato's unwritten doctrines; History of philosophy; Ancient Greek philosophy; Roman philosophy; Platonism; Christian philosophy; Metaphysics; Ethics

Giovanni Reale (15 April 1931 – 15 October 2014) was an Italian historian of philosophy.

== Biography ==
Reale was born in Candia Lomellina, Pavia. He attended the Gymnasium and the Liceo classico of Casale Monferrato, and was then educated at the Università Cattolica del Sacro Cuore of Milan, where he graduated. He later continued his studies in Marburg an der Lahn and Munich.

After a period of teaching in high schools, he won a professorship at the University of Parma, where he taught courses in moral philosophy and the history of philosophy. He then returned to the Università Cattolica del Sacro Cuore of Milan, where he was professor of the history of ancient philosophy for many years, and where he also founded the Centro di Ricerche di Metafisica. In 2005 he moved to teach at the new faculty of philosophy at Vita-Salute San Raffaele University of Milan.

He died on 15 October 2014 in his home in Luino.

== Research ==
His main argument is that categories of Greek philosophy and its particular way of thinking led to the birth and development of the science and technology in the West.

His research interests range throughout the ancient pagan and Christian thought, and his most significant contributions have touched gradually Aristotle, Plato, Plotinus, Socrates and Augustine of Hippo. He studied each of these authors from an against-the-grain perspective, inaugurating, in the opinion of Cornelia de Vogel, a new reading of these authors.

Reale's reinterpretation of Aristotle disputes the positivist-influenced interpretation of Werner Jaeger, according to which the writings of Aristotle are informed by a progression of dominant beliefs: at first, theology, where debate is in reference to God; then metaphysics, where the universal rights of man are the focus; and finally arriving at the viewpoint of science. Reale argued instead the fundamental unity of the metaphysical thought of Aristotle.

Reale was one of the main proponents of the existence of Plato's unwritten doctrines or theory of the principles, a metaphysical theory ascribed to Plato by Aristotle and other ancient philosophers, but not clearly formulated in his writings. According to Reale, the best and most important part of Plato's philosophy was precisely the one orally expounded to the students in the Academy.

== Works ==
Reale's main writings are:

- Il concetto di filosofia prima e l'unità della Metafisica di Aristotele, Vita e Pensiero, Milan (1961), then Bompiani, Milan (2008)
- Introduzione a Aristotele, Laterza, Bari (1974)
- Storia della filosofia antica, 5 volumes, Vita e Pensiero, Milan (1975, reissued several times)
- Il pensiero occidentale dalle origini ad oggi, La Scuola, Brescia (1983)
- Per una nuova interpretazione di Platone, CUSL, Milan (1984), then Vita e Pensiero, Milan (2003)
- Introduzione a Introduzione a Proclo, Laterza, Bari (1989)
- Filosofia antica, Jaca Book, Milan (1992)
- Saggezza antica, Cortina, Milan (1995)
- Eros demone mediatore, Rizzoli, Milan (1997)
- Platone. Alla ricerca della sapienza segreta, Rizzoli, Milan (1997), then Bompiani, Milan (2005)
- Guida alla lettura della Metafisica di Aristotele, Laterza, Bari (1997)
- Raffaello: La "Disputa", Rusconi, Milan (1998)
- Corpo, anima e salute, Cortina, Milan (1999)
- Socrate. Alla scoperta della sapienza umana, Rizzoli, Milan (1999)
- Il pensiero antico, Vita e Pensiero, Milan (2001)
- La filosofia di Seneca come terapia dei mali dell'anima, Bompiani, Milan (2003)
- Radici culturali e spirituali dell'Europa, Cortina, Milan (2003)
- Storia della filosofia greca e romana, 10 volumes, Bompiani, Milan (2004)
- Valori dimenticati dell'Occidente, Bompiani, Milan (2004)
- L'arte di Riccardo Muti e la Musa platonica, Bompiani, Milan (2005)
- Come leggere Agostino, Bompiani, Milan (2005)
- Karol Wojtyla un pellegrino dell'assoluto, Bompiani, Milan (2005)
- Autotestimonianze e rimandi dei Dialoghi di Platone alle "Dottrine non scritte", Bompiani, Milan (2008)
- Storia del pensiero filosofico e scientifico, La Scuola, Brescia (2012)
- Cento anni di filosofia. Da Nietzsche ai nostri giorni, La Scuola, Brescia (2015)

=== Translations and comments ===
- Reale, Giovanni (1985). The Systems of the Hellenistic Age. Translated by Catan, John R. (1st ed.). Albany, New York: SUNY Press. ISBN 9780887060083.
- Reale, Giovanni (1990). The Schools of the Imperial Age. Translated by Catan, John R. (1st ed.). Albany, New York: SUNY Press. ISBN 9780791401286.
- Reale, Giovanni (1990). Plato and Aristotle. Translated by Catan, John R. (1st ed.). Albany, New York: SUNY Press. ISBN 9780791405178.

== Honors ==
- Knight Grand Cross of the Order of Merit of the Italian Republic – «Initiative of the President of Italy», 3 June 2011
- "Roncisvalle" Prize of the University of Navarra
- Honorary citizen of Syracuse

=== Honorary degree ===
- International Academy of Philosophy of Liechtenstein
- John Paul II Catholic University of Lublin
- Moscow State University
