= Vittorio Hösle =

German philosopher (born 1960)

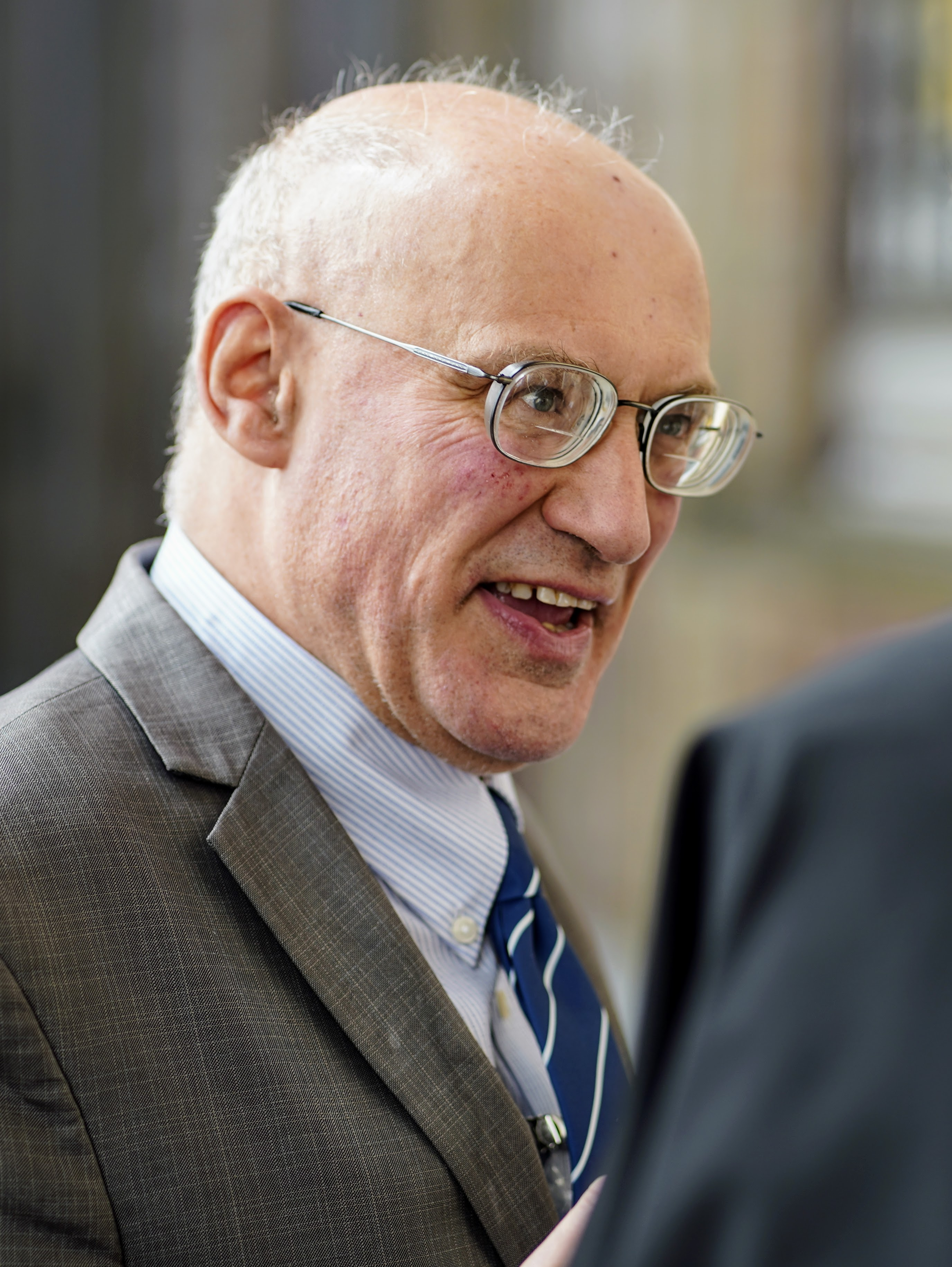
- Hösle in 2020
- Born: 25 June 1960 (age 66); Milan, Italy

Education
- Education: University of Tübingen (PhD, 1982; Dr. phil. hab., 1986)
- Doctoral advisor: H. J. Krämer; D. Wandschneider

Philosophical work
- Era: Contemporary philosophy
- Region: Western philosophy
- School: Continental philosophy Objective idealism Moral realism
- Institutions: University of Notre Dame; Boston College
- Main interests: Practical philosophy
- Notable ideas: Moral universalism in Christianity as a form of moral progress

Vittorio Hösle (/ˈhɜːrslə/; German: [ˈhøːslə]; born 25 June 1960) is an Italian-born German philosopher. He has authored works including Hegels System (1987), Moral und Politik (1997; trans. as Morals and Politics, 2004), and Der philosophische Dialog (The Philosophical Dialogue, 2006).

== Academic career ==
In 1982 Hösle completed his doctorate in philosophy (with a thesis titled Wahrheit und Geschichte: Studien zur Struktur der Philosophiegeschichte unter paradigmatischer Analyse der Entwicklung von Parmenides bis Platon) at age of 21, and earned his habilitation in philosophy in 1986 (with a thesis titled Subjektivität und Intersubjektivität: Untersuchungen zu Hegels System) at the age of 25, both from the University of Tübingen. Because of his speed in accomplishing these feats, he was called a "Wunderkind" and "the Boris Becker of philosophy".

As of July 2009, Hösle has written or edited 32 books (in at least 16 languages), and written over 125 articles. In Europe he has become "something of a celebrity, the subject of two documentaries shown on TV stations throughout Europe and even Korea." On 6 August 2013, Pope Francis appointed him ordinary member of the Pontifical Academy of Social Sciences.

Hösle personally estimates that he, conservatively, can communicate in at least seventeen different languages, listing German, Italian, English, Spanish, Russian, Norwegian, and French; passive knowledge of Latin, Greek, Sanskrit, Pali, Avestan, Portuguese, Catalan, Modern Greek, Swedish, and Danish."

He has been in the United States since 1999, at the University of Notre Dame where he is the Paul Kimball Professor of Arts and Letters (with concurrent appointments in the Departments of German, Philosophy, and Political Science). Since 2008, he has also served as the founding Director of the Notre Dame Institute for Advanced Study. In 2026, he was appointed as the Frederick J. Adelmann Chair at Boston College.

=== Morals and Politics ===
Hösle's magnum opus is his approximately 1,000 page Morals and Politics (1997; trans. 2004). In it, he claims to present "a comprehensive vision of all the knowledge needed to answer the difficult question of what constitutes moral policies in the various fields of politics such as foreign policy, domestic policy, economics, ecology and such." To do so it offers a normative foundation of the relation between ethics and politics, a descriptive theory of the objects of political philosophy (including anthropology, sociobiology, the virtues, the principles of power, and the theory of the states), from both of which premises he derives "a concrete political ethics" appropriate for the twenty-first century.

Morals and Politics attempts to overcome the complete decoupling of politics from ethics which begins with Machiavelli, and finds its most horrifying ultimate expression in Carl Schmitt. Hösle argues that only objective moral reason itself can criticize excess moralism in politics because "it is only a self-limitation of the moral that can be taken seriously, not a limitation of the moral by something external to it—for this something external would itself have to appear before the tribunal of moral judgment."

Hösle defends not just moral universalism, but maintains that the increase of universalist ethical consciousness in Christianity is an undeniable form of moral progress. Hösle states that his greatest concern is that "in the historical cataclysms that face us, we will abandon not the self-destructive aspects of modernity, but rather precisely its universalism." Hösle believes that Carl Schmitt, like Friedrich Nietzsche before him and the related movement of National Socialism, all illustrate the "artificial atavism" of those who attempt to repudiate universalist ideas after their historical discovery. Such repudiations result in raw power-positivism, rather than the naïve identification with traditional, pre-modern culture which is the surface intention of such "counter-enlightenment" theories.

Hösle defends ethical universalism and many recent achievements of the modern state, such as "the international codification of human rights." He also argues that the foundation of the worldview which supports human rights is "eroding with increasing speed," and therefore the political cataclysms of the twentieth century are by no means "merely superficial phenomena that ultimately belong to the past." Hösle challenges certain modern excesses, such as the loss of a transcendent horizon of consciousness. He argues that an excessive focus on economic growth and ever-expanding consumption has increased perceived needs more quickly than it can meet them, which leads to self-absorption and lovelessness, and a demand for more resources ecologically than can be sustained for future generations or universalized to all the people of the world. Hösle considers the modern state's (classical) liberal capitalism, as qualified by the late-modern welfare state, a significant moral achievement due to its highly efficient production and distribution of goods. Hösle argues these moral reasons to limit moralism in economics, that John Rawls's difference principle cannot be unconditionally valid in economics, and that the technical expertise of economists is a necessary component in determining the proper means of preventing excessively large social oppositions from arising.

== Philosophical work ==
Hösle's own philosophy combines "objective idealism" with a theory of intersubjectivity. In this way he seeks to unite the traditional idealistic philosophy of Plato and Hegel with the transcendental pragmatics developed by Karl-Otto Apel. Hösle describes himself as attempting to revitalize "objective idealism": "The conviction that we can have synthetic a priori knowledge, and that this knowledge discovers something that is independent of our mind, is of particular importance for practical philosophy. It grounds the position called "moral realism": Albeit the moral law is neither a physical nor a mental nor a social fact, it is nevertheless; it belongs to an ideal sphere of being that partly determines the structures of real (physical, mental, social) being."

Hösle believes that his approach runs counter to the dominant trends of Western philosophy following the rise of post-Hegelian philosophy in the 1830s, and especially amid "that ultra-critical thinking which…has swept over Europe like a great wave" beginning in the 1960s. A useful introduction to the many grounds on which Hösle criticizes the often-unchallenged relativistic assumptions of our time is provided in "Foundational Issues of Objective Idealism," the opening essay of Objective Idealism, Ethics and Politics (1998). He establishes his positive position largely through reflexive or transcendental reasoning—that is, reflections upon the necessary presuppositions of all reason and speech. While the theoretical alternative Hösle provides is largely Platonic and Hegelian, his practical philosophy could be described as a modified Kantianism, and is developed in the same volume's second essay: "The Greatness and Limits of Kant's Practical Philosophy." There Hösle argues that the autonomous, rationalist, and universalist positions of Kant, based on the synthetic a priori, remain unsurpassed and indispensable achievements. However, Hösle does grant that Kant was mistaken in neglecting the need to cultivate the emotions, as well as in his overly formalist approach, which neglects the need for concrete knowledge of circumstances and wrongly denies the possibility of morally compelling exceptions to objective moral rules.

== Select publications ==
- "Cicero's Plato." Wiener Studien 121 (2008): 145–170.
- Darwinism and Philosophy (co-edited with Christian Illies). Notre Dame: University of Notre Dame Press, 2005.
- "Did the Greeks Deliberately Use the Golden Ratio in an Artwork? A Hermeneutical Reflection." La Parola del Passato 362 (2009): 415–26.
- "The Idea of a Rationalistic Philosophy of Religion and Its Challenges." Jahrbuch für Religionsphilosophie 6 (2007): 159–181
- Hegels System: Der Idealismus der Subjektivität und das Problem der Intersubjektivität. [Hegel's System: The Idealism of Subjectivity and the Problem of Intersubjectivity.] 2 volumes. Hamburg: Felix Meiner Verlag, 1987. 2nd edition, 1998.
- "Interpreting Philosophical Dialogues." Antike und Abendland 48 (2002): 68–90.
- "Is There Progress in the History of Philosophy?" In Hegel's History of Philosophy, ed. D. A. Duquette, 185–204. Albany, NY: SUNY Press, 2003.
- "The Lost Prodigal Son's Corporal Works of Mercy and the Bridegroom's Wedding: The Religious Subtext of Charles Dickens’ Great Expectations." Anglia 126 (2008): 477–502.
- Moral und Politik: Grundlagen einer politischen Ethik für das 21. Jahrhundert. Munich: Beck, 1997. Morals and Politics, trans. Steven Rendall. Notre Dame: Notre Dame University Press, 2004.
- Objective Idealism, Ethics and Politics. Notre Dame: University of Notre Dame Press, 1998.
- Platon interpretieren. Paderborn: Ferdinand Schöningh, 2004.
- Der philosophische Dialog: Eine Poetik und Hermeneutik. [The Philosophical Dialogue: A Poetic and Hermeneutical Theory.] München: C. H. Beck Verlag, 2006.
- "Philosophy and its Languages: A Philosopher's Reflections on the Rise of English as Universal Academic Language." In The Contest of Languages, ed. M.Bloomer, 245–62. Notre Dame: University of Notre Dame Press, 2005.
- Philosophie der ökologischen Krise: Moskauer Vorträge. [Philosophy of the Ecological Crisis: Moscow Lectures.] München: C.H.Beck, 1991.
- "Vico's Age of Heroes and the Age of Men in John Ford's Film The Man Who Shot Liberty Valance" (co-authored with Mark Roche). Clio 23 (1994): 131–147.
- "Vico und die Idee der Kulturwissenschaft" ["Vico and the Idea of Cultural Science."] Introduction to Giambattista Vico, Prinzipien einer neuen Wissenschaft über die gemeinsame Natur der Völker [Principles of a New Science concerning the Common Nature of Peoples.] Ed. and trans. Hösle and Ch. Jermann. 2 volumes. Hamburg: Felix Meiner Verlag, 1990.
- Woody Allen: An Essay on the Nature of the Comical. Notre Dame: University of Notre Dame Press, 2007.
- Eine kurze Geschichte der deutschen Philosophie. Rückblick auf den deutschen Geist. Beck, München 2013, ISBN 978-3-406-64864-9 [A Short History of German Philosophy. A Retrospective on the German Spirit].
- God as Reason: Essays in Philosophical Theology. Notre Dame: University of Notre Dame Press, 2013, ISBN 978-0-268-03098-8
- Kritik der verstehenden Vernunft. Eine Grundlegung der Geisteswissenschaften. München: Verlag C. H. Beck, 2018, ISBN 978-3-406-72588-3. [Critique of Hermeneutic Reason. A Groundwork of Humanities]
- Globale Fliehkräfte – eine Geschichtsphilosophische Kartierung der Gegenwart. 2021^{3} Freiberg/München: Verlag Karl Alber/Verlag Herder GmbH, ISBN 978-65-5504-220-7. [Global Centrifugal Forces - A Charting of the Present based on Philosophy of History]
- Mit dem Rücken zu Russland: Der Ukrainekrieg und die Fehler des Westens. Baden-Baden: Karl Alber Verlag, 2022, ISBN 978-3-495-99940-0 (printed) e ISBN 978-3-495-99941-7 (ePDF). [With your Back to Russia: The Ukraine War and the Errors of the West].

== See also ==
- Plato's unwritten doctrines, for the Tübingen School of Plato's interpretation
