= Cornelia Johanna de Vogel =

Dutch philosopher and theologian (1905 – 1986)

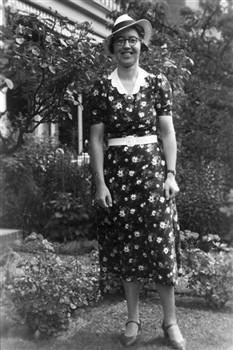
Cornelia Johanna de Vogel in 1939

Cornelia Johanna de Vogel (27 February 1905 – 7 May 1986) was a Dutch classicist, philosopher and theologian. She was a “distinguished Dutch Plato scholar”, and a prolific author of ancient philosophy and patristic theology. She was the professor of the history of classical and medieval philosophy at the state university of Utrecht (1947–74).

== Life and education ==
Born on 27 February 1905 in Leeuwarden, the Frisian capital, Cornelia Johanna de Vogel was the daughter of the pharmacist Cornelis Johannes de Vogel (1860 – 1926) and his wife Janna Jansje Theunisse (1871 – 1951). After completing her early education at the Primary Girls School in Hofplein, she continued secondary school education at a Municipal Gymnasium from 1918 to 1924. In 1925 she enrolled at the University of Utrecht to study classical languages and philosophy, where she came to know Bernard Jan Hendrik Ovink (BJH Ovink), Utrecht professor.

During her secondary school days, she showed interest on the works of BJH Ovink, particularly the book entitled Overview of Greek Philosophy, of which she published the fourth edition in 1943. Her religious and intellectual life was influenced by the writings of BJH Ovink, and the Protestant theologians such as Karl Barth and Emil Brunner.

In 1932 she obtained her master's degree in classical languages from the University of Utrecht. She also passed the doctoral examination in 1932, which conferred the title of doctorandus and the right to present a thesis for the doctoral degree. She then travelled to Athens to work on her thesis at the École française d'Athènes. She wrote her doctoral thesis on A turning point in Plato's thinking: Historical-Philosophical Study. On 1 May 1936, she received her doctorate cum laude from the University of Utrecht.

She died in Westenschouwen, Renesse on 7 May 1986.

== Career ==
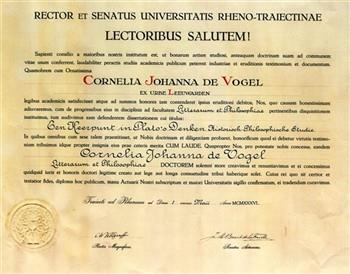
Doctor's degree CJ de Vogel, 1936

She started her professional career as a teacher. Between 1927 and 1929 she taught classical languages at the Christelijk Lyceum in Harderwijk. From 1938 to 1946 she worked as a private teacher of Greek and Latin in The Hague. On 7 December 1946, she was appointed professor of classical and medieval philosophy at the University of Utrecht. She later became professor of philosophy of classical antiquity and early Christian philosophy at the same university on 8 May 1968. She held this professorship until her retirement in 1974.

After her retirement, she moved to Renesse, on the Zeeland of Schouwen-Duiveland, where she had a relatively isolated existence. She participated in number of international academic discussions, and delivered guest lectures in New York, Manila, Tokyo and Taipei.

== Religion ==
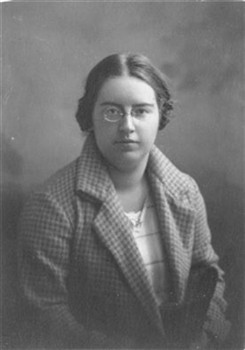
Cornelia Johanna de Vogel in 1925

Although she came from a liberal background, she showed interest in theosophy and Greek philosophy. She joined the Dutch Reformed Church in 1927. She later developed interest in the faith of the Roman Catholic Church. In 1944 she converted to the Roman Catholic Church. During the 1970s and the early 1980s, she emerged as one of the intellectual spokespersons of the conservative Catholics in the Netherlands.

== Publications ==
Some of her publications include

- Living Stones (1931)
- Newman's thoughts on justification (1939)
- Ecclesia Catholica: Reasonable justification of a personal choice (1945)
- Greek Philosophy (in three volumes: 1950, 1953,1959)
- Pythagoras and early Pythagoreanism (1966)
- Rethinking Plato and Platonism
- To the Catholics of the Netherlands (1973)
- The Foundation of Our Certainty: On the Problems of the Church Today, A contribution to real theological discussion (1977)
