= Herwig Görgemanns =

German classicist and philologist

- Born: 2 September 1931 (age 93); Alpen
- Known for: Platonic philology, Atlantis theory
- Scientific career
- Fields: Classical studies
- Institutions: Heidelberg University

Herwig Görgemanns (born 2 September 1931) is a German classicist, former professor and emeritus of classical philology at Heidelberg University.

In Würzburg he presented his dissertation in classical philology: contributions to the interpretation of Plato's Laws (1959). With an analysis on Plutarch's dialogue "De facie in orbe luna" he habilitated in 1965 in Heidelberg. His teacher was Franz Dirlmeier. In 1967/1968 he was a Fellow at the Center for Hellenic Studies at Harvard University. In 1972 Görgemanns became Professor for classical philology at Heidelberg University. In 1997 he retired.

His focus was on Greek philology, especially Plato. In this context he presented a hypothesis on a possible historical core of Plato's Atlantis story.

Together with church historian Heinrich Karpp (1908–1997) he translated Peri archon/De principiis by Origenes.

One of his students is the Plutarch researcher Rainer Hirsch-Luipold, Göttingen.

== Partial bibliography ==
- Beiträge zur Interpretation von Platons Nomoi (= Zetemata. issue 25). Munich 1960.
- Untersuchungen zu Plutarchs Dialog „De facie in orbe lunae“ (= Bibliothek der klassischen Altertumswissenschaften. Bd. 33). Heidelberg 1970.
- Origenes: Vier Bücher von den Prinzipien (= Texte zur Forschung Vol. 24). Darmstadt 1976. ISBN 3-534-00593-7.
- Platon. Heidelberg 1994. ISBN 3-8253-0203-2.
- Platon und die atlantische Insel. Die Entstehung eines Geschichtsmythos, in: Hellenische Mythologie: Vorgeschichte. Die Hellenen und ihre Nachbarn von der Vorgeschichte bis zur klassischen Periode. Tagung, 9.–11.12.1994, Ohlstadt, Oberbayern, Deutschland. Altenburg 1996, pp. 107–124.
- Wahrheit und Fiktion in Platons Atlantis-Erzählung, in: Hermes No. 128 / 2000; pp. 405–420.
